

418001–418100 

|-bgcolor=#fefefe
| 418001 ||  || — || October 7, 2007 || Kitt Peak || Spacewatch || — || align=right data-sort-value="0.77" | 770 m || 
|-id=002 bgcolor=#d6d6d6
| 418002 ||  || — || October 8, 2007 || Kitt Peak || Spacewatch || 7:4 || align=right | 3.5 km || 
|-id=003 bgcolor=#fefefe
| 418003 ||  || — || October 12, 2007 || Kitt Peak || Spacewatch || — || align=right data-sort-value="0.68" | 680 m || 
|-id=004 bgcolor=#fefefe
| 418004 ||  || — || October 10, 2007 || Catalina || CSS || — || align=right data-sort-value="0.75" | 750 m || 
|-id=005 bgcolor=#d6d6d6
| 418005 ||  || — || October 11, 2007 || Catalina || CSS || — || align=right | 4.5 km || 
|-id=006 bgcolor=#fefefe
| 418006 ||  || — || October 8, 2007 || Anderson Mesa || LONEOS || — || align=right data-sort-value="0.76" | 760 m || 
|-id=007 bgcolor=#fefefe
| 418007 ||  || — || October 9, 2007 || Mount Lemmon || Mount Lemmon Survey || — || align=right data-sort-value="0.78" | 780 m || 
|-id=008 bgcolor=#fefefe
| 418008 ||  || — || October 13, 2007 || Socorro || LINEAR || — || align=right | 1.1 km || 
|-id=009 bgcolor=#fefefe
| 418009 ||  || — || October 14, 2007 || Mount Lemmon || Mount Lemmon Survey || — || align=right data-sort-value="0.72" | 720 m || 
|-id=010 bgcolor=#fefefe
| 418010 ||  || — || October 15, 2007 || Mount Lemmon || Mount Lemmon Survey || V || align=right data-sort-value="0.59" | 590 m || 
|-id=011 bgcolor=#fefefe
| 418011 ||  || — || October 14, 2007 || Socorro || LINEAR || — || align=right data-sort-value="0.93" | 930 m || 
|-id=012 bgcolor=#fefefe
| 418012 ||  || — || October 16, 2007 || 7300 Observatory || W. K. Y. Yeung || — || align=right data-sort-value="0.81" | 810 m || 
|-id=013 bgcolor=#fefefe
| 418013 ||  || — || October 18, 2007 || Socorro || LINEAR || — || align=right | 1.0 km || 
|-id=014 bgcolor=#fefefe
| 418014 ||  || — || September 14, 2007 || Mount Lemmon || Mount Lemmon Survey || — || align=right data-sort-value="0.76" | 760 m || 
|-id=015 bgcolor=#fefefe
| 418015 ||  || — || September 15, 2007 || Mount Lemmon || Mount Lemmon Survey || — || align=right data-sort-value="0.72" | 720 m || 
|-id=016 bgcolor=#fefefe
| 418016 ||  || — || October 9, 2007 || Catalina || CSS || — || align=right | 1.1 km || 
|-id=017 bgcolor=#fefefe
| 418017 ||  || — || October 16, 2007 || Mount Lemmon || Mount Lemmon Survey || — || align=right | 1.5 km || 
|-id=018 bgcolor=#fefefe
| 418018 ||  || — || September 8, 2007 || Mount Lemmon || Mount Lemmon Survey || — || align=right data-sort-value="0.71" | 710 m || 
|-id=019 bgcolor=#fefefe
| 418019 ||  || — || October 24, 2007 || Mount Lemmon || Mount Lemmon Survey || — || align=right data-sort-value="0.79" | 790 m || 
|-id=020 bgcolor=#fefefe
| 418020 ||  || — || October 30, 2007 || Catalina || CSS || BAP || align=right data-sort-value="0.93" | 930 m || 
|-id=021 bgcolor=#fefefe
| 418021 ||  || — || October 30, 2007 || Mount Lemmon || Mount Lemmon Survey || — || align=right data-sort-value="0.71" | 710 m || 
|-id=022 bgcolor=#fefefe
| 418022 ||  || — || October 11, 2007 || Kitt Peak || Spacewatch || — || align=right data-sort-value="0.71" | 710 m || 
|-id=023 bgcolor=#fefefe
| 418023 ||  || — || October 17, 2007 || Mount Lemmon || Mount Lemmon Survey || V || align=right data-sort-value="0.59" | 590 m || 
|-id=024 bgcolor=#fefefe
| 418024 ||  || — || October 30, 2007 || Kitt Peak || Spacewatch || MAS || align=right data-sort-value="0.74" | 740 m || 
|-id=025 bgcolor=#fefefe
| 418025 ||  || — || October 30, 2007 || Kitt Peak || Spacewatch || — || align=right data-sort-value="0.66" | 660 m || 
|-id=026 bgcolor=#fefefe
| 418026 ||  || — || October 31, 2007 || Mount Lemmon || Mount Lemmon Survey || — || align=right data-sort-value="0.73" | 730 m || 
|-id=027 bgcolor=#fefefe
| 418027 ||  || — || October 30, 2007 || Kitt Peak || Spacewatch || — || align=right data-sort-value="0.95" | 950 m || 
|-id=028 bgcolor=#fefefe
| 418028 ||  || — || October 30, 2007 || Kitt Peak || Spacewatch || — || align=right data-sort-value="0.69" | 690 m || 
|-id=029 bgcolor=#fefefe
| 418029 ||  || — || October 30, 2007 || Kitt Peak || Spacewatch || NYS || align=right data-sort-value="0.58" | 580 m || 
|-id=030 bgcolor=#fefefe
| 418030 ||  || — || October 31, 2007 || Kitt Peak || Spacewatch || — || align=right data-sort-value="0.99" | 990 m || 
|-id=031 bgcolor=#fefefe
| 418031 ||  || — || October 16, 2007 || Mount Lemmon || Mount Lemmon Survey || — || align=right data-sort-value="0.79" | 790 m || 
|-id=032 bgcolor=#fefefe
| 418032 ||  || — || October 30, 2007 || Mount Lemmon || Mount Lemmon Survey || — || align=right data-sort-value="0.50" | 500 m || 
|-id=033 bgcolor=#d6d6d6
| 418033 ||  || — || October 30, 2007 || Kitt Peak || Spacewatch || — || align=right | 2.9 km || 
|-id=034 bgcolor=#fefefe
| 418034 || 2007 VH || — || November 1, 2007 || Calvin-Rehoboth || L. A. Molnar || — || align=right data-sort-value="0.68" | 680 m || 
|-id=035 bgcolor=#fefefe
| 418035 ||  || — || November 2, 2007 || Mount Lemmon || Mount Lemmon Survey || — || align=right data-sort-value="0.84" | 840 m || 
|-id=036 bgcolor=#fefefe
| 418036 ||  || — || October 9, 2007 || Kitt Peak || Spacewatch || — || align=right data-sort-value="0.74" | 740 m || 
|-id=037 bgcolor=#fefefe
| 418037 ||  || — || November 1, 2007 || Mount Lemmon || Mount Lemmon Survey || — || align=right data-sort-value="0.68" | 680 m || 
|-id=038 bgcolor=#fefefe
| 418038 ||  || — || September 25, 2000 || Kitt Peak || Spacewatch || — || align=right | 1.2 km || 
|-id=039 bgcolor=#fefefe
| 418039 ||  || — || November 2, 2007 || Mount Lemmon || Mount Lemmon Survey || — || align=right data-sort-value="0.87" | 870 m || 
|-id=040 bgcolor=#fefefe
| 418040 ||  || — || November 1, 2007 || Kitt Peak || Spacewatch || NYS || align=right data-sort-value="0.58" | 580 m || 
|-id=041 bgcolor=#fefefe
| 418041 ||  || — || October 20, 2007 || Kitt Peak || Spacewatch || — || align=right data-sort-value="0.76" | 760 m || 
|-id=042 bgcolor=#fefefe
| 418042 ||  || — || November 3, 2007 || Kitt Peak || Spacewatch || — || align=right data-sort-value="0.96" | 960 m || 
|-id=043 bgcolor=#fefefe
| 418043 ||  || — || October 16, 2007 || Kitt Peak || Spacewatch || — || align=right data-sort-value="0.66" | 660 m || 
|-id=044 bgcolor=#fefefe
| 418044 ||  || — || September 9, 2007 || Mount Lemmon || Mount Lemmon Survey || — || align=right data-sort-value="0.77" | 770 m || 
|-id=045 bgcolor=#fefefe
| 418045 ||  || — || September 26, 2007 || Mount Lemmon || Mount Lemmon Survey || — || align=right data-sort-value="0.79" | 790 m || 
|-id=046 bgcolor=#fefefe
| 418046 ||  || — || November 3, 2007 || Kitt Peak || Spacewatch || — || align=right data-sort-value="0.76" | 760 m || 
|-id=047 bgcolor=#fefefe
| 418047 ||  || — || November 3, 2007 || Kitt Peak || Spacewatch || — || align=right data-sort-value="0.72" | 720 m || 
|-id=048 bgcolor=#fefefe
| 418048 ||  || — || November 3, 2007 || Kitt Peak || Spacewatch || — || align=right data-sort-value="0.68" | 680 m || 
|-id=049 bgcolor=#fefefe
| 418049 ||  || — || October 20, 2007 || Mount Lemmon || Mount Lemmon Survey || — || align=right data-sort-value="0.70" | 700 m || 
|-id=050 bgcolor=#fefefe
| 418050 ||  || — || November 5, 2007 || Kitt Peak || Spacewatch || — || align=right data-sort-value="0.95" | 950 m || 
|-id=051 bgcolor=#d6d6d6
| 418051 ||  || — || March 14, 2005 || Mount Lemmon || Mount Lemmon Survey || — || align=right | 3.1 km || 
|-id=052 bgcolor=#d6d6d6
| 418052 ||  || — || November 4, 2007 || Mount Lemmon || Mount Lemmon Survey || — || align=right | 2.2 km || 
|-id=053 bgcolor=#fefefe
| 418053 ||  || — || November 4, 2007 || Kitt Peak || Spacewatch || — || align=right data-sort-value="0.64" | 640 m || 
|-id=054 bgcolor=#fefefe
| 418054 ||  || — || September 18, 2007 || Mount Lemmon || Mount Lemmon Survey || — || align=right data-sort-value="0.64" | 640 m || 
|-id=055 bgcolor=#fefefe
| 418055 ||  || — || November 2, 2007 || Kitt Peak || Spacewatch || — || align=right data-sort-value="0.62" | 620 m || 
|-id=056 bgcolor=#fefefe
| 418056 ||  || — || November 5, 2007 || Kitt Peak || Spacewatch || — || align=right data-sort-value="0.82" | 820 m || 
|-id=057 bgcolor=#fefefe
| 418057 ||  || — || November 5, 2007 || Kitt Peak || Spacewatch || — || align=right data-sort-value="0.75" | 750 m || 
|-id=058 bgcolor=#fefefe
| 418058 ||  || — || November 5, 2007 || Kitt Peak || Spacewatch || — || align=right data-sort-value="0.75" | 750 m || 
|-id=059 bgcolor=#fefefe
| 418059 ||  || — || November 5, 2007 || Kitt Peak || Spacewatch || — || align=right data-sort-value="0.62" | 620 m || 
|-id=060 bgcolor=#fefefe
| 418060 ||  || — || November 5, 2007 || Kitt Peak || Spacewatch || — || align=right data-sort-value="0.74" | 740 m || 
|-id=061 bgcolor=#fefefe
| 418061 ||  || — || October 10, 2007 || Kitt Peak || Spacewatch || — || align=right data-sort-value="0.71" | 710 m || 
|-id=062 bgcolor=#fefefe
| 418062 ||  || — || November 4, 2007 || Kitt Peak || Spacewatch || — || align=right data-sort-value="0.67" | 670 m || 
|-id=063 bgcolor=#fefefe
| 418063 ||  || — || October 21, 2007 || Mount Lemmon || Mount Lemmon Survey || V || align=right data-sort-value="0.70" | 700 m || 
|-id=064 bgcolor=#fefefe
| 418064 ||  || — || November 28, 2003 || Kitt Peak || Spacewatch || — || align=right data-sort-value="0.71" | 710 m || 
|-id=065 bgcolor=#fefefe
| 418065 ||  || — || November 5, 2007 || Mount Lemmon || Mount Lemmon Survey || — || align=right data-sort-value="0.60" | 600 m || 
|-id=066 bgcolor=#fefefe
| 418066 ||  || — || November 8, 2007 || Mount Lemmon || Mount Lemmon Survey || — || align=right data-sort-value="0.85" | 850 m || 
|-id=067 bgcolor=#fefefe
| 418067 ||  || — || November 9, 2007 || Mount Lemmon || Mount Lemmon Survey || — || align=right data-sort-value="0.82" | 820 m || 
|-id=068 bgcolor=#fefefe
| 418068 ||  || — || November 9, 2007 || Mount Lemmon || Mount Lemmon Survey || — || align=right data-sort-value="0.74" | 740 m || 
|-id=069 bgcolor=#fefefe
| 418069 ||  || — || November 9, 2007 || Kitt Peak || Spacewatch || — || align=right data-sort-value="0.69" | 690 m || 
|-id=070 bgcolor=#fefefe
| 418070 ||  || — || November 9, 2007 || Kitt Peak || Spacewatch || — || align=right data-sort-value="0.75" | 750 m || 
|-id=071 bgcolor=#fefefe
| 418071 ||  || — || November 5, 2007 || Kitt Peak || Spacewatch || — || align=right data-sort-value="0.91" | 910 m || 
|-id=072 bgcolor=#fefefe
| 418072 ||  || — || November 12, 2007 || Dauban || Chante-Perdrix Obs. || — || align=right data-sort-value="0.85" | 850 m || 
|-id=073 bgcolor=#FA8072
| 418073 ||  || — || October 9, 2007 || Catalina || CSS || — || align=right data-sort-value="0.93" | 930 m || 
|-id=074 bgcolor=#fefefe
| 418074 ||  || — || November 1, 2007 || Kitt Peak || Spacewatch || V || align=right data-sort-value="0.55" | 550 m || 
|-id=075 bgcolor=#fefefe
| 418075 ||  || — || November 13, 2007 || Kitt Peak || Spacewatch || — || align=right data-sort-value="0.86" | 860 m || 
|-id=076 bgcolor=#fefefe
| 418076 ||  || — || November 12, 2007 || Catalina || CSS || — || align=right data-sort-value="0.93" | 930 m || 
|-id=077 bgcolor=#fefefe
| 418077 ||  || — || November 12, 2007 || Socorro || LINEAR || — || align=right data-sort-value="0.87" | 870 m || 
|-id=078 bgcolor=#fefefe
| 418078 ||  || — || November 14, 2007 || Kitt Peak || Spacewatch || V || align=right data-sort-value="0.57" | 570 m || 
|-id=079 bgcolor=#fefefe
| 418079 ||  || — || November 14, 2007 || Kitt Peak || Spacewatch || V || align=right data-sort-value="0.65" | 650 m || 
|-id=080 bgcolor=#fefefe
| 418080 ||  || — || November 14, 2007 || Kitt Peak || Spacewatch || — || align=right data-sort-value="0.96" | 960 m || 
|-id=081 bgcolor=#d6d6d6
| 418081 ||  || — || November 13, 2007 || Kitt Peak || Spacewatch || 7:4 || align=right | 5.8 km || 
|-id=082 bgcolor=#d6d6d6
| 418082 ||  || — || November 3, 2007 || Kitt Peak || Spacewatch || — || align=right | 3.4 km || 
|-id=083 bgcolor=#FA8072
| 418083 ||  || — || November 4, 2007 || Kitt Peak || Spacewatch || — || align=right | 1.6 km || 
|-id=084 bgcolor=#fefefe
| 418084 ||  || — || November 11, 2007 || Mount Lemmon || Mount Lemmon Survey || — || align=right data-sort-value="0.68" | 680 m || 
|-id=085 bgcolor=#d6d6d6
| 418085 ||  || — || November 9, 2007 || Mount Lemmon || Mount Lemmon Survey || 3:2 || align=right | 4.0 km || 
|-id=086 bgcolor=#fefefe
| 418086 ||  || — || November 2, 2007 || Mount Lemmon || Mount Lemmon Survey || V || align=right data-sort-value="0.68" | 680 m || 
|-id=087 bgcolor=#fefefe
| 418087 ||  || — || November 4, 2007 || Kitt Peak || Spacewatch || — || align=right data-sort-value="0.61" | 610 m || 
|-id=088 bgcolor=#fefefe
| 418088 ||  || — || November 4, 2007 || Kitt Peak || Spacewatch || — || align=right data-sort-value="0.73" | 730 m || 
|-id=089 bgcolor=#fefefe
| 418089 ||  || — || November 8, 2007 || Socorro || LINEAR || — || align=right data-sort-value="0.79" | 790 m || 
|-id=090 bgcolor=#fefefe
| 418090 ||  || — || November 8, 2007 || Socorro || LINEAR || — || align=right data-sort-value="0.94" | 940 m || 
|-id=091 bgcolor=#fefefe
| 418091 ||  || — || November 9, 2007 || Kitt Peak || Spacewatch || V || align=right data-sort-value="0.53" | 530 m || 
|-id=092 bgcolor=#d6d6d6
| 418092 ||  || — || November 9, 2007 || Kitt Peak || Spacewatch || 7:4 || align=right | 3.6 km || 
|-id=093 bgcolor=#fefefe
| 418093 ||  || — || September 14, 2007 || Mount Lemmon || Mount Lemmon Survey || NYS || align=right data-sort-value="0.64" | 640 m || 
|-id=094 bgcolor=#FFC2E0
| 418094 ||  || — || November 19, 2007 || Kitt Peak || Spacewatch || APOPHA || align=right data-sort-value="0.89" | 890 m || 
|-id=095 bgcolor=#fefefe
| 418095 ||  || — || November 17, 2007 || Socorro || LINEAR || V || align=right data-sort-value="0.86" | 860 m || 
|-id=096 bgcolor=#fefefe
| 418096 ||  || — || November 4, 2007 || Kitt Peak || Spacewatch || — || align=right data-sort-value="0.80" | 800 m || 
|-id=097 bgcolor=#fefefe
| 418097 ||  || — || November 4, 2007 || Kitt Peak || Spacewatch || — || align=right data-sort-value="0.91" | 910 m || 
|-id=098 bgcolor=#fefefe
| 418098 ||  || — || November 19, 2007 || Mount Lemmon || Mount Lemmon Survey || — || align=right data-sort-value="0.89" | 890 m || 
|-id=099 bgcolor=#fefefe
| 418099 ||  || — || February 9, 2005 || Kitt Peak || Spacewatch || — || align=right data-sort-value="0.90" | 900 m || 
|-id=100 bgcolor=#fefefe
| 418100 ||  || — || November 17, 2007 || Kitt Peak || Spacewatch || — || align=right data-sort-value="0.91" | 910 m || 
|}

418101–418200 

|-bgcolor=#fefefe
| 418101 ||  || — || November 20, 2007 || Socorro || LINEAR || — || align=right data-sort-value="0.79" | 790 m || 
|-id=102 bgcolor=#fefefe
| 418102 ||  || — || December 3, 2007 || Kitt Peak || Spacewatch || — || align=right data-sort-value="0.69" | 690 m || 
|-id=103 bgcolor=#fefefe
| 418103 ||  || — || December 4, 2007 || Kitt Peak || Spacewatch || — || align=right data-sort-value="0.60" | 600 m || 
|-id=104 bgcolor=#fefefe
| 418104 ||  || — || November 7, 2007 || Kitt Peak || Spacewatch || — || align=right data-sort-value="0.78" | 780 m || 
|-id=105 bgcolor=#fefefe
| 418105 ||  || — || December 15, 2007 || La Sagra || OAM Obs. || — || align=right | 1.5 km || 
|-id=106 bgcolor=#fefefe
| 418106 ||  || — || December 14, 2007 || Catalina || CSS || — || align=right | 1.5 km || 
|-id=107 bgcolor=#fefefe
| 418107 ||  || — || December 5, 2007 || Kitt Peak || Spacewatch || NYS || align=right data-sort-value="0.62" | 620 m || 
|-id=108 bgcolor=#fefefe
| 418108 ||  || — || December 6, 2007 || Mount Lemmon || Mount Lemmon Survey || — || align=right | 2.8 km || 
|-id=109 bgcolor=#fefefe
| 418109 ||  || — || December 4, 2007 || Kitt Peak || Spacewatch || — || align=right data-sort-value="0.98" | 980 m || 
|-id=110 bgcolor=#fefefe
| 418110 ||  || — || December 14, 2007 || Mount Lemmon || Mount Lemmon Survey || V || align=right data-sort-value="0.72" | 720 m || 
|-id=111 bgcolor=#FA8072
| 418111 ||  || — || December 18, 2007 || Catalina || CSS || critical || align=right data-sort-value="0.59" | 590 m || 
|-id=112 bgcolor=#fefefe
| 418112 ||  || — || December 16, 2007 || Kitt Peak || Spacewatch || — || align=right | 2.5 km || 
|-id=113 bgcolor=#fefefe
| 418113 ||  || — || December 17, 2007 || Mount Lemmon || Mount Lemmon Survey || — || align=right data-sort-value="0.62" | 620 m || 
|-id=114 bgcolor=#fefefe
| 418114 ||  || — || December 17, 2007 || Mount Lemmon || Mount Lemmon Survey || — || align=right data-sort-value="0.74" | 740 m || 
|-id=115 bgcolor=#fefefe
| 418115 ||  || — || December 17, 2007 || Mount Lemmon || Mount Lemmon Survey || — || align=right | 1.1 km || 
|-id=116 bgcolor=#fefefe
| 418116 ||  || — || December 4, 2007 || Kitt Peak || Spacewatch || — || align=right | 1.00 km || 
|-id=117 bgcolor=#fefefe
| 418117 ||  || — || December 28, 2007 || Kitt Peak || Spacewatch || — || align=right data-sort-value="0.83" | 830 m || 
|-id=118 bgcolor=#fefefe
| 418118 ||  || — || December 28, 2007 || Kitt Peak || Spacewatch || — || align=right data-sort-value="0.75" | 750 m || 
|-id=119 bgcolor=#fefefe
| 418119 ||  || — || November 18, 2007 || Mount Lemmon || Mount Lemmon Survey || — || align=right data-sort-value="0.75" | 750 m || 
|-id=120 bgcolor=#fefefe
| 418120 ||  || — || December 17, 2007 || Kitt Peak || Spacewatch || — || align=right data-sort-value="0.81" | 810 m || 
|-id=121 bgcolor=#fefefe
| 418121 ||  || — || December 30, 2007 || Kitt Peak || Spacewatch || — || align=right data-sort-value="0.71" | 710 m || 
|-id=122 bgcolor=#fefefe
| 418122 ||  || — || December 30, 2007 || Catalina || CSS || — || align=right | 1.1 km || 
|-id=123 bgcolor=#fefefe
| 418123 ||  || — || December 15, 2007 || Kitt Peak || Spacewatch || — || align=right data-sort-value="0.59" | 590 m || 
|-id=124 bgcolor=#fefefe
| 418124 ||  || — || December 14, 2007 || Mount Lemmon || Mount Lemmon Survey || (2076) || align=right data-sort-value="0.73" | 730 m || 
|-id=125 bgcolor=#fefefe
| 418125 ||  || — || December 31, 2007 || Mount Lemmon || Mount Lemmon Survey || NYS || align=right data-sort-value="0.63" | 630 m || 
|-id=126 bgcolor=#fefefe
| 418126 ||  || — || December 30, 2007 || Mount Lemmon || Mount Lemmon Survey || — || align=right data-sort-value="0.60" | 600 m || 
|-id=127 bgcolor=#fefefe
| 418127 ||  || — || December 16, 2007 || Kitt Peak || Spacewatch || — || align=right data-sort-value="0.93" | 930 m || 
|-id=128 bgcolor=#fefefe
| 418128 ||  || — || December 30, 2007 || Mount Lemmon || Mount Lemmon Survey || NYS || align=right data-sort-value="0.62" | 620 m || 
|-id=129 bgcolor=#fefefe
| 418129 ||  || — || October 27, 2003 || Kitt Peak || Spacewatch || — || align=right data-sort-value="0.67" | 670 m || 
|-id=130 bgcolor=#fefefe
| 418130 ||  || — || December 30, 2007 || Mount Lemmon || Mount Lemmon Survey || (5026) || align=right data-sort-value="0.73" | 730 m || 
|-id=131 bgcolor=#fefefe
| 418131 ||  || — || December 31, 2007 || Kitt Peak || Spacewatch || — || align=right data-sort-value="0.84" | 840 m || 
|-id=132 bgcolor=#fefefe
| 418132 ||  || — || January 10, 2008 || Mount Lemmon || Mount Lemmon Survey || — || align=right data-sort-value="0.77" | 770 m || 
|-id=133 bgcolor=#fefefe
| 418133 ||  || — || January 10, 2008 || Mount Lemmon || Mount Lemmon Survey || — || align=right data-sort-value="0.90" | 900 m || 
|-id=134 bgcolor=#fefefe
| 418134 ||  || — || December 30, 2007 || Mount Lemmon || Mount Lemmon Survey || — || align=right data-sort-value="0.73" | 730 m || 
|-id=135 bgcolor=#FFC2E0
| 418135 ||  || — || January 12, 2008 || Mount Lemmon || Mount Lemmon Survey || APOPHA || align=right data-sort-value="0.44" | 440 m || 
|-id=136 bgcolor=#fefefe
| 418136 ||  || — || January 10, 2008 || Kitt Peak || Spacewatch || MAS || align=right data-sort-value="0.57" | 570 m || 
|-id=137 bgcolor=#fefefe
| 418137 ||  || — || January 10, 2008 || Kitt Peak || Spacewatch || V || align=right data-sort-value="0.70" | 700 m || 
|-id=138 bgcolor=#fefefe
| 418138 ||  || — || March 10, 2005 || Kitt Peak || Spacewatch || — || align=right data-sort-value="0.79" | 790 m || 
|-id=139 bgcolor=#fefefe
| 418139 ||  || — || January 10, 2008 || Kitt Peak || Spacewatch || MAS || align=right data-sort-value="0.67" | 670 m || 
|-id=140 bgcolor=#fefefe
| 418140 ||  || — || January 1, 2008 || Kitt Peak || Spacewatch || — || align=right data-sort-value="0.63" | 630 m || 
|-id=141 bgcolor=#fefefe
| 418141 ||  || — || November 4, 2007 || Mount Lemmon || Mount Lemmon Survey || — || align=right data-sort-value="0.55" | 550 m || 
|-id=142 bgcolor=#d6d6d6
| 418142 ||  || — || January 11, 2008 || Kitt Peak || Spacewatch || 3:2 || align=right | 3.6 km || 
|-id=143 bgcolor=#fefefe
| 418143 ||  || — || December 30, 2007 || Mount Lemmon || Mount Lemmon Survey || NYS || align=right data-sort-value="0.66" | 660 m || 
|-id=144 bgcolor=#fefefe
| 418144 ||  || — || January 11, 2008 || Catalina || CSS || — || align=right data-sort-value="0.72" | 720 m || 
|-id=145 bgcolor=#fefefe
| 418145 ||  || — || January 11, 2008 || Mount Lemmon || Mount Lemmon Survey || — || align=right data-sort-value="0.89" | 890 m || 
|-id=146 bgcolor=#fefefe
| 418146 ||  || — || January 11, 2008 || Kitt Peak || Spacewatch || — || align=right data-sort-value="0.62" | 620 m || 
|-id=147 bgcolor=#fefefe
| 418147 ||  || — || December 31, 2007 || Kitt Peak || Spacewatch || — || align=right data-sort-value="0.63" | 630 m || 
|-id=148 bgcolor=#fefefe
| 418148 ||  || — || December 31, 2007 || Mount Lemmon || Mount Lemmon Survey || — || align=right data-sort-value="0.90" | 900 m || 
|-id=149 bgcolor=#fefefe
| 418149 ||  || — || December 31, 2007 || Kitt Peak || Spacewatch || V || align=right data-sort-value="0.59" | 590 m || 
|-id=150 bgcolor=#fefefe
| 418150 ||  || — || December 14, 2007 || Mount Lemmon || Mount Lemmon Survey || — || align=right data-sort-value="0.66" | 660 m || 
|-id=151 bgcolor=#fefefe
| 418151 ||  || — || January 13, 2008 || Kitt Peak || Spacewatch || V || align=right data-sort-value="0.65" | 650 m || 
|-id=152 bgcolor=#fefefe
| 418152 ||  || — || January 11, 2008 || Kitt Peak || Spacewatch || — || align=right data-sort-value="0.79" | 790 m || 
|-id=153 bgcolor=#fefefe
| 418153 ||  || — || January 13, 2008 || Kitt Peak || Spacewatch || NYS || align=right data-sort-value="0.54" | 540 m || 
|-id=154 bgcolor=#fefefe
| 418154 ||  || — || January 13, 2008 || Kitt Peak || Spacewatch || — || align=right data-sort-value="0.55" | 550 m || 
|-id=155 bgcolor=#fefefe
| 418155 ||  || — || January 14, 2008 || Kitt Peak || Spacewatch || MAS || align=right data-sort-value="0.63" | 630 m || 
|-id=156 bgcolor=#fefefe
| 418156 ||  || — || January 14, 2008 || Kitt Peak || Spacewatch || — || align=right data-sort-value="0.82" | 820 m || 
|-id=157 bgcolor=#fefefe
| 418157 ||  || — || January 1, 2008 || Kitt Peak || Spacewatch || — || align=right data-sort-value="0.57" | 570 m || 
|-id=158 bgcolor=#fefefe
| 418158 ||  || — || December 3, 2007 || Kitt Peak || Spacewatch || — || align=right data-sort-value="0.64" | 640 m || 
|-id=159 bgcolor=#fefefe
| 418159 ||  || — || December 31, 2007 || Kitt Peak || Spacewatch || NYS || align=right data-sort-value="0.55" | 550 m || 
|-id=160 bgcolor=#fefefe
| 418160 ||  || — || January 15, 2008 || Kitt Peak || Spacewatch || V || align=right data-sort-value="0.75" | 750 m || 
|-id=161 bgcolor=#fefefe
| 418161 ||  || — || January 15, 2008 || Kitt Peak || Spacewatch || NYS || align=right data-sort-value="0.59" | 590 m || 
|-id=162 bgcolor=#fefefe
| 418162 ||  || — || January 15, 2008 || Kitt Peak || Spacewatch || — || align=right data-sort-value="0.71" | 710 m || 
|-id=163 bgcolor=#fefefe
| 418163 ||  || — || April 11, 2005 || Mount Lemmon || Mount Lemmon Survey || — || align=right data-sort-value="0.82" | 820 m || 
|-id=164 bgcolor=#fefefe
| 418164 ||  || — || January 10, 2008 || Mount Lemmon || Mount Lemmon Survey || — || align=right data-sort-value="0.76" | 760 m || 
|-id=165 bgcolor=#fefefe
| 418165 ||  || — || January 6, 2008 || Mauna Kea || Mauna Kea Obs. || MAS || align=right data-sort-value="0.56" | 560 m || 
|-id=166 bgcolor=#E9E9E9
| 418166 ||  || — || January 11, 2008 || Mount Lemmon || Mount Lemmon Survey || KON || align=right | 2.4 km || 
|-id=167 bgcolor=#fefefe
| 418167 ||  || — || January 16, 2008 || Kitt Peak || Spacewatch || NYS || align=right data-sort-value="0.63" | 630 m || 
|-id=168 bgcolor=#fefefe
| 418168 ||  || — || January 16, 2008 || Kitt Peak || Spacewatch || — || align=right data-sort-value="0.90" | 900 m || 
|-id=169 bgcolor=#fefefe
| 418169 ||  || — || January 16, 2008 || Kitt Peak || Spacewatch || — || align=right data-sort-value="0.62" | 620 m || 
|-id=170 bgcolor=#fefefe
| 418170 ||  || — || January 18, 2008 || Kitt Peak || Spacewatch || — || align=right data-sort-value="0.72" | 720 m || 
|-id=171 bgcolor=#fefefe
| 418171 ||  || — || January 30, 2008 || Mount Lemmon || Mount Lemmon Survey || — || align=right data-sort-value="0.82" | 820 m || 
|-id=172 bgcolor=#fefefe
| 418172 ||  || — || January 30, 2008 || Mount Lemmon || Mount Lemmon Survey || MAS || align=right data-sort-value="0.68" | 680 m || 
|-id=173 bgcolor=#E9E9E9
| 418173 ||  || — || January 30, 2008 || Kitt Peak || Spacewatch || — || align=right | 1.1 km || 
|-id=174 bgcolor=#E9E9E9
| 418174 ||  || — || November 19, 2007 || Kitt Peak || Spacewatch || — || align=right | 1.5 km || 
|-id=175 bgcolor=#fefefe
| 418175 ||  || — || January 30, 2008 || Catalina || CSS || MAS || align=right data-sort-value="0.66" | 660 m || 
|-id=176 bgcolor=#fefefe
| 418176 ||  || — || January 10, 2008 || Kitt Peak || Spacewatch || NYS || align=right data-sort-value="0.55" | 550 m || 
|-id=177 bgcolor=#fefefe
| 418177 ||  || — || January 30, 2008 || Mount Lemmon || Mount Lemmon Survey || MAS || align=right data-sort-value="0.80" | 800 m || 
|-id=178 bgcolor=#fefefe
| 418178 ||  || — || January 30, 2008 || Kitt Peak || Spacewatch || — || align=right data-sort-value="0.89" | 890 m || 
|-id=179 bgcolor=#fefefe
| 418179 ||  || — || December 5, 2007 || Mount Lemmon || Mount Lemmon Survey || — || align=right data-sort-value="0.74" | 740 m || 
|-id=180 bgcolor=#fefefe
| 418180 ||  || — || January 30, 2008 || Mount Lemmon || Mount Lemmon Survey || — || align=right data-sort-value="0.93" | 930 m || 
|-id=181 bgcolor=#fefefe
| 418181 ||  || — || January 30, 2008 || Mount Lemmon || Mount Lemmon Survey || V || align=right data-sort-value="0.60" | 600 m || 
|-id=182 bgcolor=#fefefe
| 418182 ||  || — || January 16, 2008 || Kitt Peak || Spacewatch || NYS || align=right data-sort-value="0.63" | 630 m || 
|-id=183 bgcolor=#fefefe
| 418183 ||  || — || February 3, 2008 || Mayhill || A. Lowe || — || align=right | 1.7 km || 
|-id=184 bgcolor=#fefefe
| 418184 ||  || — || February 2, 2008 || Catalina || CSS || — || align=right | 1.5 km || 
|-id=185 bgcolor=#fefefe
| 418185 ||  || — || November 8, 2007 || Mount Lemmon || Mount Lemmon Survey || — || align=right data-sort-value="0.99" | 990 m || 
|-id=186 bgcolor=#fefefe
| 418186 ||  || — || January 11, 2008 || Mount Lemmon || Mount Lemmon Survey || — || align=right data-sort-value="0.71" | 710 m || 
|-id=187 bgcolor=#E9E9E9
| 418187 ||  || — || February 2, 2008 || Kitt Peak || Spacewatch || — || align=right | 1.5 km || 
|-id=188 bgcolor=#fefefe
| 418188 ||  || — || February 3, 2008 || Kitt Peak || Spacewatch || — || align=right data-sort-value="0.69" | 690 m || 
|-id=189 bgcolor=#fefefe
| 418189 ||  || — || February 3, 2008 || Kitt Peak || Spacewatch || — || align=right data-sort-value="0.72" | 720 m || 
|-id=190 bgcolor=#fefefe
| 418190 ||  || — || February 1, 2008 || Kitt Peak || Spacewatch || MAS || align=right data-sort-value="0.65" | 650 m || 
|-id=191 bgcolor=#fefefe
| 418191 ||  || — || February 1, 2008 || Kitt Peak || Spacewatch || — || align=right data-sort-value="0.74" | 740 m || 
|-id=192 bgcolor=#fefefe
| 418192 ||  || — || January 16, 2008 || Kitt Peak || Spacewatch || — || align=right data-sort-value="0.77" | 770 m || 
|-id=193 bgcolor=#fefefe
| 418193 ||  || — || February 2, 2008 || Kitt Peak || Spacewatch || — || align=right data-sort-value="0.94" | 940 m || 
|-id=194 bgcolor=#fefefe
| 418194 ||  || — || January 9, 2008 || Mount Lemmon || Mount Lemmon Survey || V || align=right data-sort-value="0.68" | 680 m || 
|-id=195 bgcolor=#E9E9E9
| 418195 ||  || — || February 2, 2008 || Kitt Peak || Spacewatch || — || align=right | 1.6 km || 
|-id=196 bgcolor=#fefefe
| 418196 ||  || — || December 29, 2003 || Kitt Peak || Spacewatch || — || align=right data-sort-value="0.74" | 740 m || 
|-id=197 bgcolor=#fefefe
| 418197 ||  || — || February 7, 2008 || Mount Lemmon || Mount Lemmon Survey || — || align=right data-sort-value="0.98" | 980 m || 
|-id=198 bgcolor=#FFC2E0
| 418198 ||  || — || February 9, 2008 || Siding Spring || SSS || ATE || align=right data-sort-value="0.56" | 560 m || 
|-id=199 bgcolor=#fefefe
| 418199 ||  || — || February 1, 2008 || Kitt Peak || Spacewatch || — || align=right data-sort-value="0.80" | 800 m || 
|-id=200 bgcolor=#fefefe
| 418200 ||  || — || February 7, 2008 || Kitt Peak || Spacewatch || — || align=right data-sort-value="0.76" | 760 m || 
|}

418201–418300 

|-bgcolor=#fefefe
| 418201 ||  || — || February 7, 2008 || Mount Lemmon || Mount Lemmon Survey || — || align=right | 1.1 km || 
|-id=202 bgcolor=#E9E9E9
| 418202 ||  || — || February 8, 2008 || Kitt Peak || Spacewatch || ADE || align=right | 2.1 km || 
|-id=203 bgcolor=#fefefe
| 418203 ||  || — || August 21, 2006 || Kitt Peak || Spacewatch || — || align=right data-sort-value="0.79" | 790 m || 
|-id=204 bgcolor=#E9E9E9
| 418204 ||  || — || February 9, 2008 || Kitt Peak || Spacewatch || — || align=right data-sort-value="0.86" | 860 m || 
|-id=205 bgcolor=#fefefe
| 418205 ||  || — || January 13, 2008 || Kitt Peak || Spacewatch || — || align=right data-sort-value="0.70" | 700 m || 
|-id=206 bgcolor=#fefefe
| 418206 ||  || — || February 8, 2008 || Kitt Peak || Spacewatch || — || align=right data-sort-value="0.84" | 840 m || 
|-id=207 bgcolor=#fefefe
| 418207 ||  || — || October 23, 2003 || Kitt Peak || Spacewatch || NYS || align=right data-sort-value="0.52" | 520 m || 
|-id=208 bgcolor=#fefefe
| 418208 ||  || — || February 8, 2008 || Kitt Peak || Spacewatch || — || align=right data-sort-value="0.67" | 670 m || 
|-id=209 bgcolor=#fefefe
| 418209 ||  || — || February 1, 2008 || Kitt Peak || Spacewatch || — || align=right data-sort-value="0.71" | 710 m || 
|-id=210 bgcolor=#fefefe
| 418210 ||  || — || February 9, 2008 || Kitt Peak || Spacewatch || — || align=right data-sort-value="0.83" | 830 m || 
|-id=211 bgcolor=#fefefe
| 418211 ||  || — || February 9, 2008 || Kitt Peak || Spacewatch || — || align=right data-sort-value="0.69" | 690 m || 
|-id=212 bgcolor=#fefefe
| 418212 ||  || — || February 9, 2008 || Kitt Peak || Spacewatch || NYS || align=right data-sort-value="0.60" | 600 m || 
|-id=213 bgcolor=#fefefe
| 418213 ||  || — || November 13, 2007 || Mount Lemmon || Mount Lemmon Survey || — || align=right data-sort-value="0.94" | 940 m || 
|-id=214 bgcolor=#fefefe
| 418214 ||  || — || February 9, 2008 || Kitt Peak || Spacewatch || — || align=right | 1.3 km || 
|-id=215 bgcolor=#E9E9E9
| 418215 ||  || — || June 28, 2001 || Kitt Peak || Spacewatch || (5) || align=right | 1.0 km || 
|-id=216 bgcolor=#fefefe
| 418216 ||  || — || February 10, 2008 || Kitt Peak || Spacewatch || — || align=right data-sort-value="0.82" | 820 m || 
|-id=217 bgcolor=#FA8072
| 418217 ||  || — || February 10, 2008 || Črni Vrh || Črni Vrh || — || align=right data-sort-value="0.64" | 640 m || 
|-id=218 bgcolor=#fefefe
| 418218 ||  || — || January 11, 2008 || Mount Lemmon || Mount Lemmon Survey || — || align=right data-sort-value="0.66" | 660 m || 
|-id=219 bgcolor=#fefefe
| 418219 ||  || — || February 12, 2008 || Mount Lemmon || Mount Lemmon Survey || — || align=right | 1.1 km || 
|-id=220 bgcolor=#fefefe
| 418220 Kestutis ||  ||  || February 3, 2008 || Baldone || K. Černis, I. Eglītis || NYS || align=right data-sort-value="0.59" | 590 m || 
|-id=221 bgcolor=#fefefe
| 418221 ||  || — || February 11, 2008 || Mount Lemmon || Mount Lemmon Survey || — || align=right | 1.3 km || 
|-id=222 bgcolor=#fefefe
| 418222 ||  || — || February 2, 2008 || Catalina || CSS || — || align=right data-sort-value="0.80" | 800 m || 
|-id=223 bgcolor=#E9E9E9
| 418223 ||  || — || February 11, 2008 || Mount Lemmon || Mount Lemmon Survey || — || align=right | 1.9 km || 
|-id=224 bgcolor=#fefefe
| 418224 ||  || — || February 8, 2008 || Kitt Peak || Spacewatch || — || align=right data-sort-value="0.73" | 730 m || 
|-id=225 bgcolor=#fefefe
| 418225 ||  || — || February 10, 2008 || Mount Lemmon || Mount Lemmon Survey || — || align=right data-sort-value="0.95" | 950 m || 
|-id=226 bgcolor=#E9E9E9
| 418226 ||  || — || December 11, 2006 || Kitt Peak || Spacewatch || — || align=right | 1.7 km || 
|-id=227 bgcolor=#fefefe
| 418227 ||  || — || February 14, 2008 || Mount Lemmon || Mount Lemmon Survey || — || align=right data-sort-value="0.66" | 660 m || 
|-id=228 bgcolor=#fefefe
| 418228 ||  || — || February 13, 2008 || Mount Lemmon || Mount Lemmon Survey || — || align=right data-sort-value="0.80" | 800 m || 
|-id=229 bgcolor=#E9E9E9
| 418229 ||  || — || February 8, 2008 || Kitt Peak || Spacewatch || — || align=right data-sort-value="0.94" | 940 m || 
|-id=230 bgcolor=#C2FFFF
| 418230 ||  || — || February 10, 2008 || Mount Lemmon || Mount Lemmon Survey || L5 || align=right | 7.9 km || 
|-id=231 bgcolor=#E9E9E9
| 418231 ||  || — || February 13, 2008 || Mount Lemmon || Mount Lemmon Survey || — || align=right | 3.2 km || 
|-id=232 bgcolor=#fefefe
| 418232 ||  || — || September 28, 2003 || Kitt Peak || Spacewatch || — || align=right data-sort-value="0.71" | 710 m || 
|-id=233 bgcolor=#FFC2E0
| 418233 ||  || — || February 26, 2008 || Mount Lemmon || Mount Lemmon Survey || APO +1kmcritical || align=right data-sort-value="0.81" | 810 m || 
|-id=234 bgcolor=#fefefe
| 418234 ||  || — || February 26, 2008 || Kitt Peak || Spacewatch || — || align=right data-sort-value="0.70" | 700 m || 
|-id=235 bgcolor=#E9E9E9
| 418235 ||  || — || February 28, 2008 || Kitt Peak || Spacewatch || — || align=right data-sort-value="0.83" | 830 m || 
|-id=236 bgcolor=#fefefe
| 418236 ||  || — || February 27, 2008 || Catalina || CSS || — || align=right data-sort-value="0.68" | 680 m || 
|-id=237 bgcolor=#fefefe
| 418237 ||  || — || February 26, 2008 || Mount Lemmon || Mount Lemmon Survey || — || align=right data-sort-value="0.57" | 570 m || 
|-id=238 bgcolor=#fefefe
| 418238 ||  || — || February 27, 2008 || Kitt Peak || Spacewatch || — || align=right data-sort-value="0.62" | 620 m || 
|-id=239 bgcolor=#fefefe
| 418239 ||  || — || January 11, 2008 || Mount Lemmon || Mount Lemmon Survey || — || align=right data-sort-value="0.67" | 670 m || 
|-id=240 bgcolor=#fefefe
| 418240 ||  || — || February 27, 2008 || Catalina || CSS || — || align=right | 2.2 km || 
|-id=241 bgcolor=#fefefe
| 418241 ||  || — || February 27, 2008 || Kitt Peak || Spacewatch || H || align=right data-sort-value="0.62" | 620 m || 
|-id=242 bgcolor=#fefefe
| 418242 ||  || — || February 27, 2008 || Kitt Peak || Spacewatch || — || align=right data-sort-value="0.60" | 600 m || 
|-id=243 bgcolor=#E9E9E9
| 418243 ||  || — || February 28, 2008 || Kitt Peak || Spacewatch || — || align=right data-sort-value="0.95" | 950 m || 
|-id=244 bgcolor=#fefefe
| 418244 ||  || — || February 26, 2008 || Socorro || LINEAR || — || align=right | 1.0 km || 
|-id=245 bgcolor=#E9E9E9
| 418245 ||  || — || February 28, 2008 || Catalina || CSS || EUN || align=right | 2.9 km || 
|-id=246 bgcolor=#fefefe
| 418246 ||  || — || February 28, 2008 || Mount Lemmon || Mount Lemmon Survey || MAS || align=right data-sort-value="0.73" | 730 m || 
|-id=247 bgcolor=#fefefe
| 418247 ||  || — || February 28, 2008 || Mount Lemmon || Mount Lemmon Survey || — || align=right data-sort-value="0.61" | 610 m || 
|-id=248 bgcolor=#E9E9E9
| 418248 ||  || — || February 29, 2008 || Kitt Peak || Spacewatch || — || align=right | 1.1 km || 
|-id=249 bgcolor=#fefefe
| 418249 ||  || — || February 12, 2008 || Kitt Peak || Spacewatch || — || align=right data-sort-value="0.56" | 560 m || 
|-id=250 bgcolor=#E9E9E9
| 418250 ||  || — || February 28, 2008 || Mount Lemmon || Mount Lemmon Survey || — || align=right | 1.2 km || 
|-id=251 bgcolor=#fefefe
| 418251 ||  || — || February 18, 2008 || Mount Lemmon || Mount Lemmon Survey || — || align=right data-sort-value="0.94" | 940 m || 
|-id=252 bgcolor=#E9E9E9
| 418252 ||  || — || February 2, 2008 || Mount Lemmon || Mount Lemmon Survey || — || align=right | 1.0 km || 
|-id=253 bgcolor=#fefefe
| 418253 ||  || — || February 28, 2008 || Kitt Peak || Spacewatch || — || align=right data-sort-value="0.64" | 640 m || 
|-id=254 bgcolor=#fefefe
| 418254 ||  || — || February 28, 2008 || Kitt Peak || Spacewatch || — || align=right data-sort-value="0.68" | 680 m || 
|-id=255 bgcolor=#fefefe
| 418255 ||  || — || February 18, 2008 || Mount Lemmon || Mount Lemmon Survey || — || align=right data-sort-value="0.87" | 870 m || 
|-id=256 bgcolor=#fefefe
| 418256 ||  || — || February 28, 2008 || Kitt Peak || Spacewatch || NYS || align=right data-sort-value="0.59" | 590 m || 
|-id=257 bgcolor=#fefefe
| 418257 ||  || — || March 3, 2008 || Catalina || CSS || — || align=right data-sort-value="0.89" | 890 m || 
|-id=258 bgcolor=#C2FFFF
| 418258 ||  || — || March 4, 2008 || Kitt Peak || Spacewatch || L5 || align=right | 10 km || 
|-id=259 bgcolor=#E9E9E9
| 418259 ||  || — || March 1, 2008 || Kitt Peak || Spacewatch || — || align=right | 1.5 km || 
|-id=260 bgcolor=#fefefe
| 418260 ||  || — || February 2, 2008 || Mount Lemmon || Mount Lemmon Survey || NYS || align=right data-sort-value="0.65" | 650 m || 
|-id=261 bgcolor=#E9E9E9
| 418261 ||  || — || March 1, 2008 || Kitt Peak || Spacewatch || — || align=right | 1.7 km || 
|-id=262 bgcolor=#E9E9E9
| 418262 ||  || — || March 3, 2008 || Mount Lemmon || Mount Lemmon Survey || — || align=right | 1.1 km || 
|-id=263 bgcolor=#E9E9E9
| 418263 ||  || — || March 4, 2008 || Mount Lemmon || Mount Lemmon Survey || — || align=right | 1.8 km || 
|-id=264 bgcolor=#E9E9E9
| 418264 ||  || — || March 4, 2008 || Purple Mountain || PMO NEO || — || align=right | 1.1 km || 
|-id=265 bgcolor=#FFC2E0
| 418265 ||  || — || March 10, 2008 || Catalina || CSS || ATI +1km || align=right | 1.8 km || 
|-id=266 bgcolor=#E9E9E9
| 418266 ||  || — || March 1, 2008 || Kitt Peak || Spacewatch || — || align=right data-sort-value="0.85" | 850 m || 
|-id=267 bgcolor=#E9E9E9
| 418267 ||  || — || March 1, 2008 || Kitt Peak || Spacewatch || — || align=right | 1.4 km || 
|-id=268 bgcolor=#E9E9E9
| 418268 ||  || — || March 5, 2008 || Kitt Peak || Spacewatch || — || align=right | 1.3 km || 
|-id=269 bgcolor=#fefefe
| 418269 ||  || — || March 5, 2008 || Mount Lemmon || Mount Lemmon Survey || — || align=right data-sort-value="0.95" | 950 m || 
|-id=270 bgcolor=#E9E9E9
| 418270 ||  || — || March 5, 2008 || Mount Lemmon || Mount Lemmon Survey || — || align=right data-sort-value="0.97" | 970 m || 
|-id=271 bgcolor=#E9E9E9
| 418271 ||  || — || March 6, 2008 || Kitt Peak || Spacewatch || ADE || align=right | 2.1 km || 
|-id=272 bgcolor=#E9E9E9
| 418272 ||  || — || February 2, 2008 || Mount Lemmon || Mount Lemmon Survey || — || align=right | 1.3 km || 
|-id=273 bgcolor=#E9E9E9
| 418273 ||  || — || March 9, 2008 || Kitt Peak || Spacewatch || — || align=right | 1.1 km || 
|-id=274 bgcolor=#fefefe
| 418274 ||  || — || February 2, 2008 || Mount Lemmon || Mount Lemmon Survey || — || align=right | 1.1 km || 
|-id=275 bgcolor=#fefefe
| 418275 ||  || — || February 18, 2008 || Mount Lemmon || Mount Lemmon Survey || — || align=right data-sort-value="0.75" | 750 m || 
|-id=276 bgcolor=#d6d6d6
| 418276 ||  || — || March 2, 2008 || Kitt Peak || Spacewatch || 3:2 || align=right | 3.7 km || 
|-id=277 bgcolor=#fefefe
| 418277 ||  || — || March 7, 2008 || Mount Lemmon || Mount Lemmon Survey || MAS || align=right data-sort-value="0.64" | 640 m || 
|-id=278 bgcolor=#fefefe
| 418278 ||  || — || January 12, 2008 || Kitt Peak || Spacewatch || — || align=right data-sort-value="0.96" | 960 m || 
|-id=279 bgcolor=#E9E9E9
| 418279 ||  || — || March 8, 2008 || Kitt Peak || Spacewatch || — || align=right | 2.3 km || 
|-id=280 bgcolor=#fefefe
| 418280 ||  || — || August 29, 2006 || Kitt Peak || Spacewatch || — || align=right data-sort-value="0.82" | 820 m || 
|-id=281 bgcolor=#E9E9E9
| 418281 ||  || — || March 8, 2008 || Kitt Peak || Spacewatch || — || align=right data-sort-value="0.81" | 810 m || 
|-id=282 bgcolor=#fefefe
| 418282 ||  || — || March 9, 2008 || Kitt Peak || Spacewatch || — || align=right | 1.1 km || 
|-id=283 bgcolor=#E9E9E9
| 418283 ||  || — || March 11, 2008 || Kitt Peak || Spacewatch || — || align=right | 1.4 km || 
|-id=284 bgcolor=#E9E9E9
| 418284 ||  || — || March 11, 2008 || Kitt Peak || Spacewatch || — || align=right | 1.3 km || 
|-id=285 bgcolor=#fefefe
| 418285 ||  || — || March 11, 2008 || Kitt Peak || Spacewatch || MAS || align=right data-sort-value="0.58" | 580 m || 
|-id=286 bgcolor=#E9E9E9
| 418286 ||  || — || February 28, 2008 || Kitt Peak || Spacewatch || — || align=right | 1.5 km || 
|-id=287 bgcolor=#E9E9E9
| 418287 ||  || — || March 11, 2008 || Mount Lemmon || Mount Lemmon Survey || — || align=right | 1.3 km || 
|-id=288 bgcolor=#E9E9E9
| 418288 ||  || — || March 15, 2008 || Mount Lemmon || Mount Lemmon Survey || — || align=right data-sort-value="0.99" | 990 m || 
|-id=289 bgcolor=#fefefe
| 418289 ||  || — || March 7, 2008 || Kitt Peak || Spacewatch || — || align=right data-sort-value="0.74" | 740 m || 
|-id=290 bgcolor=#E9E9E9
| 418290 ||  || — || March 8, 2008 || Mount Lemmon || Mount Lemmon Survey || (5) || align=right data-sort-value="0.91" | 910 m || 
|-id=291 bgcolor=#fefefe
| 418291 ||  || — || March 10, 2008 || Kitt Peak || Spacewatch || — || align=right data-sort-value="0.96" | 960 m || 
|-id=292 bgcolor=#E9E9E9
| 418292 ||  || — || September 19, 2001 || Apache Point || SDSS || — || align=right | 2.4 km || 
|-id=293 bgcolor=#fefefe
| 418293 ||  || — || March 25, 2008 || Kitt Peak || Spacewatch || NYS || align=right data-sort-value="0.71" | 710 m || 
|-id=294 bgcolor=#fefefe
| 418294 ||  || — || February 10, 2008 || Kitt Peak || Spacewatch || — || align=right data-sort-value="0.55" | 550 m || 
|-id=295 bgcolor=#fefefe
| 418295 ||  || — || October 20, 2006 || Kitt Peak || Spacewatch || — || align=right data-sort-value="0.72" | 720 m || 
|-id=296 bgcolor=#E9E9E9
| 418296 ||  || — || March 12, 2008 || Mount Lemmon || Mount Lemmon Survey || — || align=right | 1.4 km || 
|-id=297 bgcolor=#fefefe
| 418297 ||  || — || February 7, 2008 || Kitt Peak || Spacewatch || — || align=right data-sort-value="0.75" | 750 m || 
|-id=298 bgcolor=#fefefe
| 418298 ||  || — || March 28, 2008 || Kitt Peak || Spacewatch || — || align=right data-sort-value="0.70" | 700 m || 
|-id=299 bgcolor=#fefefe
| 418299 ||  || — || February 13, 2008 || Mount Lemmon || Mount Lemmon Survey || — || align=right | 1.2 km || 
|-id=300 bgcolor=#fefefe
| 418300 ||  || — || March 28, 2008 || Kitt Peak || Spacewatch || — || align=right data-sort-value="0.71" | 710 m || 
|}

418301–418400 

|-bgcolor=#E9E9E9
| 418301 ||  || — || March 28, 2008 || Kitt Peak || Spacewatch || — || align=right | 1.2 km || 
|-id=302 bgcolor=#fefefe
| 418302 ||  || — || March 13, 2008 || Kitt Peak || Spacewatch || H || align=right data-sort-value="0.58" | 580 m || 
|-id=303 bgcolor=#E9E9E9
| 418303 ||  || — || February 27, 2008 || Kitt Peak || Spacewatch || — || align=right data-sort-value="0.84" | 840 m || 
|-id=304 bgcolor=#E9E9E9
| 418304 ||  || — || March 12, 2008 || Kitt Peak || Spacewatch || — || align=right data-sort-value="0.76" | 760 m || 
|-id=305 bgcolor=#E9E9E9
| 418305 ||  || — || March 28, 2008 || Mount Lemmon || Mount Lemmon Survey || — || align=right | 1.1 km || 
|-id=306 bgcolor=#fefefe
| 418306 ||  || — || March 28, 2008 || Mount Lemmon || Mount Lemmon Survey || — || align=right data-sort-value="0.73" | 730 m || 
|-id=307 bgcolor=#E9E9E9
| 418307 ||  || — || March 28, 2008 || Mount Lemmon || Mount Lemmon Survey || — || align=right | 1.2 km || 
|-id=308 bgcolor=#E9E9E9
| 418308 ||  || — || March 12, 2008 || Mount Lemmon || Mount Lemmon Survey || — || align=right | 1.4 km || 
|-id=309 bgcolor=#E9E9E9
| 418309 ||  || — || August 31, 2005 || Palomar || NEAT || — || align=right | 2.0 km || 
|-id=310 bgcolor=#E9E9E9
| 418310 ||  || — || March 28, 2008 || Kitt Peak || Spacewatch || (5) || align=right data-sort-value="0.90" | 900 m || 
|-id=311 bgcolor=#E9E9E9
| 418311 ||  || — || March 28, 2008 || Kitt Peak || Spacewatch || — || align=right | 1.6 km || 
|-id=312 bgcolor=#fefefe
| 418312 ||  || — || March 28, 2008 || Kitt Peak || Spacewatch || H || align=right data-sort-value="0.54" | 540 m || 
|-id=313 bgcolor=#E9E9E9
| 418313 ||  || — || March 29, 2008 || Kitt Peak || Spacewatch || — || align=right data-sort-value="0.93" | 930 m || 
|-id=314 bgcolor=#fefefe
| 418314 ||  || — || February 27, 2008 || Mount Lemmon || Mount Lemmon Survey || — || align=right data-sort-value="0.76" | 760 m || 
|-id=315 bgcolor=#E9E9E9
| 418315 ||  || — || March 30, 2008 || Kitt Peak || Spacewatch || BRG || align=right | 1.2 km || 
|-id=316 bgcolor=#E9E9E9
| 418316 ||  || — || March 30, 2008 || Kitt Peak || Spacewatch || — || align=right | 2.0 km || 
|-id=317 bgcolor=#E9E9E9
| 418317 ||  || — || March 30, 2008 || Kitt Peak || Spacewatch || — || align=right | 1.4 km || 
|-id=318 bgcolor=#E9E9E9
| 418318 ||  || — || May 19, 2004 || Kitt Peak || Spacewatch || MAR || align=right data-sort-value="0.99" | 990 m || 
|-id=319 bgcolor=#E9E9E9
| 418319 ||  || — || March 30, 2008 || Kitt Peak || Spacewatch || — || align=right | 2.0 km || 
|-id=320 bgcolor=#E9E9E9
| 418320 ||  || — || March 30, 2008 || Kitt Peak || Spacewatch || — || align=right | 1.8 km || 
|-id=321 bgcolor=#E9E9E9
| 418321 ||  || — || March 31, 2008 || Kitt Peak || Spacewatch || — || align=right | 2.5 km || 
|-id=322 bgcolor=#E9E9E9
| 418322 ||  || — || November 12, 2006 || Mount Lemmon || Mount Lemmon Survey || — || align=right data-sort-value="0.80" | 800 m || 
|-id=323 bgcolor=#fefefe
| 418323 ||  || — || March 31, 2008 || Mount Lemmon || Mount Lemmon Survey || NYS || align=right data-sort-value="0.63" | 630 m || 
|-id=324 bgcolor=#E9E9E9
| 418324 ||  || — || March 30, 2008 || Kitt Peak || Spacewatch || — || align=right | 1.7 km || 
|-id=325 bgcolor=#E9E9E9
| 418325 ||  || — || March 31, 2008 || Mount Lemmon || Mount Lemmon Survey || — || align=right | 2.1 km || 
|-id=326 bgcolor=#E9E9E9
| 418326 ||  || — || March 28, 2008 || Mount Lemmon || Mount Lemmon Survey || — || align=right | 1.6 km || 
|-id=327 bgcolor=#E9E9E9
| 418327 ||  || — || March 28, 2008 || Mount Lemmon || Mount Lemmon Survey || — || align=right | 1.4 km || 
|-id=328 bgcolor=#C2FFFF
| 418328 ||  || — || March 30, 2008 || Kitt Peak || Spacewatch || L5 || align=right | 7.9 km || 
|-id=329 bgcolor=#E9E9E9
| 418329 ||  || — || April 7, 2008 || Catalina || CSS || EUN || align=right | 1.2 km || 
|-id=330 bgcolor=#E9E9E9
| 418330 ||  || — || April 7, 2008 || Grove Creek || F. Tozzi || — || align=right | 2.3 km || 
|-id=331 bgcolor=#E9E9E9
| 418331 ||  || — || March 10, 2008 || Mount Lemmon || Mount Lemmon Survey || — || align=right | 1.7 km || 
|-id=332 bgcolor=#fefefe
| 418332 ||  || — || April 1, 2008 || Kitt Peak || Spacewatch || MAS || align=right data-sort-value="0.78" | 780 m || 
|-id=333 bgcolor=#fefefe
| 418333 ||  || — || April 1, 2008 || Kitt Peak || Spacewatch || — || align=right data-sort-value="0.70" | 700 m || 
|-id=334 bgcolor=#C2FFFF
| 418334 ||  || — || April 1, 2008 || Kitt Peak || Spacewatch || L5 || align=right | 8.2 km || 
|-id=335 bgcolor=#d6d6d6
| 418335 ||  || — || April 1, 2008 || Kitt Peak || Spacewatch || — || align=right | 4.8 km || 
|-id=336 bgcolor=#E9E9E9
| 418336 ||  || — || April 3, 2008 || Mount Lemmon || Mount Lemmon Survey || — || align=right | 1.9 km || 
|-id=337 bgcolor=#E9E9E9
| 418337 ||  || — || April 3, 2008 || Mount Lemmon || Mount Lemmon Survey || — || align=right | 1.5 km || 
|-id=338 bgcolor=#fefefe
| 418338 ||  || — || April 1, 2008 || Mount Lemmon || Mount Lemmon Survey || H || align=right data-sort-value="0.93" | 930 m || 
|-id=339 bgcolor=#fefefe
| 418339 ||  || — || April 4, 2008 || Mayhill || W. G. Dillon || NYS || align=right data-sort-value="0.75" | 750 m || 
|-id=340 bgcolor=#E9E9E9
| 418340 ||  || — || April 3, 2008 || Mount Lemmon || Mount Lemmon Survey || — || align=right | 2.2 km || 
|-id=341 bgcolor=#C2FFFF
| 418341 ||  || — || March 30, 2008 || Kitt Peak || Spacewatch || L5 || align=right | 9.2 km || 
|-id=342 bgcolor=#E9E9E9
| 418342 ||  || — || April 3, 2008 || Kitt Peak || Spacewatch || EUN || align=right data-sort-value="0.93" | 930 m || 
|-id=343 bgcolor=#C2FFFF
| 418343 ||  || — || September 21, 2001 || Apache Point || SDSS || L5 || align=right | 9.1 km || 
|-id=344 bgcolor=#fefefe
| 418344 ||  || — || April 5, 2008 || Kitt Peak || Spacewatch || V || align=right data-sort-value="0.70" | 700 m || 
|-id=345 bgcolor=#E9E9E9
| 418345 ||  || — || April 5, 2008 || Mount Lemmon || Mount Lemmon Survey || — || align=right data-sort-value="0.96" | 960 m || 
|-id=346 bgcolor=#fefefe
| 418346 ||  || — || April 5, 2008 || Kitt Peak || Spacewatch || H || align=right data-sort-value="0.60" | 600 m || 
|-id=347 bgcolor=#E9E9E9
| 418347 ||  || — || April 6, 2008 || Mount Lemmon || Mount Lemmon Survey || — || align=right | 2.8 km || 
|-id=348 bgcolor=#E9E9E9
| 418348 ||  || — || April 7, 2008 || Mount Lemmon || Mount Lemmon Survey || — || align=right | 2.3 km || 
|-id=349 bgcolor=#E9E9E9
| 418349 ||  || — || March 5, 2008 || Mount Lemmon || Mount Lemmon Survey || — || align=right | 1.2 km || 
|-id=350 bgcolor=#E9E9E9
| 418350 ||  || — || April 6, 2008 || Kitt Peak || Spacewatch || — || align=right | 1.8 km || 
|-id=351 bgcolor=#E9E9E9
| 418351 ||  || — || April 6, 2008 || Mount Lemmon || Mount Lemmon Survey || MRX || align=right data-sort-value="0.99" | 990 m || 
|-id=352 bgcolor=#E9E9E9
| 418352 ||  || — || March 8, 2008 || Socorro || LINEAR || EUN || align=right | 1.3 km || 
|-id=353 bgcolor=#E9E9E9
| 418353 ||  || — || September 24, 2005 || Kitt Peak || Spacewatch || AGN || align=right | 1.1 km || 
|-id=354 bgcolor=#E9E9E9
| 418354 ||  || — || April 4, 2008 || Kitt Peak || Spacewatch || — || align=right data-sort-value="0.91" | 910 m || 
|-id=355 bgcolor=#E9E9E9
| 418355 ||  || — || March 4, 2008 || Mount Lemmon || Mount Lemmon Survey || — || align=right | 1.1 km || 
|-id=356 bgcolor=#E9E9E9
| 418356 ||  || — || March 28, 2008 || Mount Lemmon || Mount Lemmon Survey || — || align=right data-sort-value="0.90" | 900 m || 
|-id=357 bgcolor=#E9E9E9
| 418357 ||  || — || April 9, 2008 || Kitt Peak || Spacewatch || — || align=right | 1.5 km || 
|-id=358 bgcolor=#E9E9E9
| 418358 ||  || — || April 6, 2008 || Kitt Peak || Spacewatch || — || align=right | 1.5 km || 
|-id=359 bgcolor=#E9E9E9
| 418359 ||  || — || March 28, 2008 || Kitt Peak || Spacewatch || — || align=right | 1.5 km || 
|-id=360 bgcolor=#E9E9E9
| 418360 ||  || — || April 12, 2008 || Kitt Peak || Spacewatch || DOR || align=right | 2.5 km || 
|-id=361 bgcolor=#FA8072
| 418361 ||  || — || April 8, 2008 || Socorro || LINEAR || H || align=right data-sort-value="0.59" | 590 m || 
|-id=362 bgcolor=#E9E9E9
| 418362 ||  || — || March 15, 2008 || Kitt Peak || Spacewatch || (5) || align=right data-sort-value="0.77" | 770 m || 
|-id=363 bgcolor=#E9E9E9
| 418363 ||  || — || April 11, 2008 || Catalina || CSS || — || align=right | 1.7 km || 
|-id=364 bgcolor=#E9E9E9
| 418364 ||  || — || April 11, 2008 || Mount Lemmon || Mount Lemmon Survey || — || align=right | 1.5 km || 
|-id=365 bgcolor=#E9E9E9
| 418365 ||  || — || April 3, 2008 || Mount Lemmon || Mount Lemmon Survey || MAR || align=right | 1.4 km || 
|-id=366 bgcolor=#E9E9E9
| 418366 ||  || — || March 30, 2008 || Kitt Peak || Spacewatch || — || align=right data-sort-value="0.93" | 930 m || 
|-id=367 bgcolor=#E9E9E9
| 418367 ||  || — || April 14, 2008 || Mount Lemmon || Mount Lemmon Survey || — || align=right | 2.0 km || 
|-id=368 bgcolor=#fefefe
| 418368 ||  || — || April 14, 2008 || Mount Lemmon || Mount Lemmon Survey || H || align=right data-sort-value="0.83" | 830 m || 
|-id=369 bgcolor=#E9E9E9
| 418369 ||  || — || April 13, 2008 || Mount Lemmon || Mount Lemmon Survey || MAR || align=right | 1.2 km || 
|-id=370 bgcolor=#E9E9E9
| 418370 ||  || — || April 3, 2008 || Kitt Peak || Spacewatch || — || align=right | 1.3 km || 
|-id=371 bgcolor=#E9E9E9
| 418371 ||  || — || April 11, 2008 || Socorro || LINEAR || — || align=right | 2.0 km || 
|-id=372 bgcolor=#C2FFFF
| 418372 ||  || — || February 28, 2008 || Kitt Peak || Spacewatch || L5 || align=right | 8.6 km || 
|-id=373 bgcolor=#C2FFFF
| 418373 ||  || — || April 6, 2008 || Kitt Peak || Spacewatch || L5 || align=right | 7.5 km || 
|-id=374 bgcolor=#C2FFFF
| 418374 ||  || — || April 14, 2008 || Mount Lemmon || Mount Lemmon Survey || L5 || align=right | 8.6 km || 
|-id=375 bgcolor=#E9E9E9
| 418375 ||  || — || December 20, 2007 || Kitt Peak || Spacewatch || ADE || align=right | 2.6 km || 
|-id=376 bgcolor=#E9E9E9
| 418376 ||  || — || April 14, 2008 || Mount Lemmon || Mount Lemmon Survey || — || align=right | 1.5 km || 
|-id=377 bgcolor=#E9E9E9
| 418377 ||  || — || March 6, 2008 || Kitt Peak || Spacewatch || — || align=right data-sort-value="0.97" | 970 m || 
|-id=378 bgcolor=#fefefe
| 418378 ||  || — || April 24, 2008 || Kitt Peak || Spacewatch || — || align=right data-sort-value="0.90" | 900 m || 
|-id=379 bgcolor=#fefefe
| 418379 ||  || — || April 24, 2008 || Kitt Peak || Spacewatch || — || align=right data-sort-value="0.81" | 810 m || 
|-id=380 bgcolor=#E9E9E9
| 418380 ||  || — || April 24, 2008 || Kitt Peak || Spacewatch || — || align=right data-sort-value="0.93" | 930 m || 
|-id=381 bgcolor=#E9E9E9
| 418381 ||  || — || April 25, 2008 || Kitt Peak || Spacewatch || MAR || align=right | 1.2 km || 
|-id=382 bgcolor=#E9E9E9
| 418382 ||  || — || April 25, 2008 || Kitt Peak || Spacewatch || — || align=right | 1.1 km || 
|-id=383 bgcolor=#E9E9E9
| 418383 ||  || — || April 26, 2008 || Kitt Peak || Spacewatch || — || align=right | 2.5 km || 
|-id=384 bgcolor=#E9E9E9
| 418384 ||  || — || March 15, 2008 || Mount Lemmon || Mount Lemmon Survey || — || align=right | 1.1 km || 
|-id=385 bgcolor=#E9E9E9
| 418385 ||  || — || April 15, 2008 || Mount Lemmon || Mount Lemmon Survey || — || align=right | 1.5 km || 
|-id=386 bgcolor=#fefefe
| 418386 ||  || — || April 28, 2008 || Mount Lemmon || Mount Lemmon Survey || H || align=right data-sort-value="0.57" | 570 m || 
|-id=387 bgcolor=#E9E9E9
| 418387 ||  || — || April 27, 2008 || Kitt Peak || Spacewatch || — || align=right data-sort-value="0.84" | 840 m || 
|-id=388 bgcolor=#E9E9E9
| 418388 ||  || — || April 28, 2008 || Kitt Peak || Spacewatch || — || align=right data-sort-value="0.87" | 870 m || 
|-id=389 bgcolor=#E9E9E9
| 418389 ||  || — || April 30, 2008 || Kitt Peak || Spacewatch || — || align=right | 1.5 km || 
|-id=390 bgcolor=#E9E9E9
| 418390 ||  || — || April 30, 2008 || Kitt Peak || Spacewatch || — || align=right | 2.4 km || 
|-id=391 bgcolor=#E9E9E9
| 418391 ||  || — || April 28, 2008 || Mount Lemmon || Mount Lemmon Survey || EUN || align=right | 1.6 km || 
|-id=392 bgcolor=#fefefe
| 418392 ||  || — || April 16, 2008 || Mount Lemmon || Mount Lemmon Survey || H || align=right data-sort-value="0.80" | 800 m || 
|-id=393 bgcolor=#C2FFFF
| 418393 ||  || — || April 28, 2008 || Kitt Peak || Spacewatch || L5 || align=right | 9.9 km || 
|-id=394 bgcolor=#C2FFFF
| 418394 ||  || — || April 29, 2008 || Mount Lemmon || Mount Lemmon Survey || L5 || align=right | 9.3 km || 
|-id=395 bgcolor=#E9E9E9
| 418395 ||  || — || April 16, 2008 || Mount Lemmon || Mount Lemmon Survey || — || align=right | 2.4 km || 
|-id=396 bgcolor=#E9E9E9
| 418396 ||  || — || May 1, 2008 || Kitt Peak || Spacewatch || — || align=right | 2.6 km || 
|-id=397 bgcolor=#E9E9E9
| 418397 ||  || — || May 2, 2008 || Catalina || CSS || — || align=right | 2.9 km || 
|-id=398 bgcolor=#E9E9E9
| 418398 ||  || — || April 7, 2008 || Catalina || CSS || — || align=right | 1.5 km || 
|-id=399 bgcolor=#C2FFFF
| 418399 ||  || — || May 7, 2008 || Kitt Peak || Spacewatch || L5 || align=right | 10 km || 
|-id=400 bgcolor=#C2FFFF
| 418400 ||  || — || May 8, 2008 || Kitt Peak || Spacewatch || L5 || align=right | 11 km || 
|}

418401–418500 

|-bgcolor=#E9E9E9
| 418401 ||  || — || April 29, 2008 || Kitt Peak || Spacewatch || — || align=right | 1.1 km || 
|-id=402 bgcolor=#d6d6d6
| 418402 ||  || — || May 26, 2008 || Kitt Peak || Spacewatch || — || align=right | 4.3 km || 
|-id=403 bgcolor=#fefefe
| 418403 ||  || — || May 12, 2008 || Siding Spring || SSS || H || align=right data-sort-value="0.83" | 830 m || 
|-id=404 bgcolor=#E9E9E9
| 418404 ||  || — || May 1, 2008 || Kitt Peak || Spacewatch || — || align=right | 1.4 km || 
|-id=405 bgcolor=#fefefe
| 418405 ||  || — || May 28, 2008 || Kitt Peak || Spacewatch || — || align=right | 1.0 km || 
|-id=406 bgcolor=#E9E9E9
| 418406 ||  || — || April 16, 2008 || Mount Lemmon || Mount Lemmon Survey || — || align=right | 1.9 km || 
|-id=407 bgcolor=#E9E9E9
| 418407 ||  || — || May 28, 2008 || Kitt Peak || Spacewatch || — || align=right | 1.2 km || 
|-id=408 bgcolor=#E9E9E9
| 418408 ||  || — || April 14, 2008 || Mount Lemmon || Mount Lemmon Survey || — || align=right | 1.5 km || 
|-id=409 bgcolor=#E9E9E9
| 418409 ||  || — || May 29, 2008 || Kitt Peak || Spacewatch || — || align=right | 1.5 km || 
|-id=410 bgcolor=#FA8072
| 418410 ||  || — || June 2, 2008 || Mount Lemmon || Mount Lemmon Survey || H || align=right data-sort-value="0.83" | 830 m || 
|-id=411 bgcolor=#E9E9E9
| 418411 ||  || — || June 1, 2008 || Kitt Peak || Spacewatch || — || align=right | 2.0 km || 
|-id=412 bgcolor=#E9E9E9
| 418412 ||  || — || May 28, 2008 || Kitt Peak || Spacewatch || — || align=right | 1.4 km || 
|-id=413 bgcolor=#E9E9E9
| 418413 ||  || — || April 4, 2008 || Kitt Peak || Spacewatch || — || align=right | 1.4 km || 
|-id=414 bgcolor=#E9E9E9
| 418414 ||  || — || May 3, 2008 || Mount Lemmon || Mount Lemmon Survey || MAR || align=right | 1.2 km || 
|-id=415 bgcolor=#E9E9E9
| 418415 ||  || — || May 3, 2008 || Mount Lemmon || Mount Lemmon Survey || — || align=right | 1.4 km || 
|-id=416 bgcolor=#FFC2E0
| 418416 ||  || — || June 15, 2008 || Catalina || CSS || APOPHA || align=right data-sort-value="0.31" | 310 m || 
|-id=417 bgcolor=#E9E9E9
| 418417 ||  || — || June 4, 2008 || Kitt Peak || Spacewatch || — || align=right | 2.0 km || 
|-id=418 bgcolor=#d6d6d6
| 418418 ||  || — || June 6, 2008 || Kitt Peak || Spacewatch || TIR || align=right | 3.7 km || 
|-id=419 bgcolor=#d6d6d6
| 418419 Lacanto ||  ||  || June 28, 2008 || Vicques || M. Ory || — || align=right | 4.4 km || 
|-id=420 bgcolor=#E9E9E9
| 418420 ||  || — || June 27, 2008 || Siding Spring || SSS || — || align=right | 2.9 km || 
|-id=421 bgcolor=#d6d6d6
| 418421 ||  || — || July 11, 2008 || Siding Spring || SSS || — || align=right | 2.5 km || 
|-id=422 bgcolor=#E9E9E9
| 418422 ||  || — || July 10, 2008 || Siding Spring || SSS || — || align=right | 1.4 km || 
|-id=423 bgcolor=#d6d6d6
| 418423 ||  || — || July 1, 2008 || Catalina || CSS || — || align=right | 3.2 km || 
|-id=424 bgcolor=#d6d6d6
| 418424 ||  || — || July 8, 2008 || Mount Lemmon || Mount Lemmon Survey || — || align=right | 2.7 km || 
|-id=425 bgcolor=#E9E9E9
| 418425 || 2008 OR || — || July 25, 2008 || Pla D'Arguines || R. Ferrando || — || align=right | 2.8 km || 
|-id=426 bgcolor=#d6d6d6
| 418426 ||  || — || July 25, 2008 || Siding Spring || SSS || — || align=right | 2.9 km || 
|-id=427 bgcolor=#d6d6d6
| 418427 ||  || — || July 29, 2008 || Mount Lemmon || Mount Lemmon Survey || — || align=right | 3.7 km || 
|-id=428 bgcolor=#d6d6d6
| 418428 ||  || — || July 31, 2008 || La Sagra || OAM Obs. || — || align=right | 3.3 km || 
|-id=429 bgcolor=#fefefe
| 418429 ||  || — || July 29, 2008 || Kitt Peak || Spacewatch || H || align=right data-sort-value="0.82" | 820 m || 
|-id=430 bgcolor=#d6d6d6
| 418430 ||  || — || July 29, 2008 || Kitt Peak || Spacewatch || — || align=right | 2.4 km || 
|-id=431 bgcolor=#E9E9E9
| 418431 ||  || — || July 30, 2008 || Kitt Peak || Spacewatch || — || align=right | 2.7 km || 
|-id=432 bgcolor=#d6d6d6
| 418432 ||  || — || July 30, 2008 || Catalina || CSS || BRA || align=right | 1.8 km || 
|-id=433 bgcolor=#E9E9E9
| 418433 ||  || — || March 11, 2003 || Palomar || NEAT || — || align=right | 1.4 km || 
|-id=434 bgcolor=#d6d6d6
| 418434 ||  || — || August 3, 2008 || Dauban || F. Kugel || — || align=right | 2.4 km || 
|-id=435 bgcolor=#E9E9E9
| 418435 ||  || — || February 6, 2002 || Kitt Peak || Spacewatch || — || align=right | 2.6 km || 
|-id=436 bgcolor=#d6d6d6
| 418436 ||  || — || August 5, 2008 || La Sagra || OAM Obs. || — || align=right | 2.4 km || 
|-id=437 bgcolor=#d6d6d6
| 418437 ||  || — || July 30, 2008 || Catalina || CSS || — || align=right | 3.6 km || 
|-id=438 bgcolor=#d6d6d6
| 418438 ||  || — || August 6, 2008 || Siding Spring || SSS || — || align=right | 3.3 km || 
|-id=439 bgcolor=#d6d6d6
| 418439 ||  || — || August 22, 2008 || Kitt Peak || Spacewatch || — || align=right | 3.2 km || 
|-id=440 bgcolor=#d6d6d6
| 418440 ||  || — || August 22, 2008 || Kitt Peak || Spacewatch || EOS || align=right | 2.1 km || 
|-id=441 bgcolor=#d6d6d6
| 418441 ||  || — || August 25, 2008 || La Sagra || OAM Obs. || — || align=right | 2.3 km || 
|-id=442 bgcolor=#d6d6d6
| 418442 ||  || — || August 22, 2008 || Kitt Peak || Spacewatch || — || align=right | 3.7 km || 
|-id=443 bgcolor=#d6d6d6
| 418443 ||  || — || August 28, 2008 || La Sagra || OAM Obs. || — || align=right | 2.8 km || 
|-id=444 bgcolor=#d6d6d6
| 418444 ||  || — || August 29, 2008 || Taunus || E. Schwab, R. Kling || HYG || align=right | 2.6 km || 
|-id=445 bgcolor=#d6d6d6
| 418445 ||  || — || September 22, 2003 || Anderson Mesa || LONEOS || — || align=right | 2.7 km || 
|-id=446 bgcolor=#d6d6d6
| 418446 ||  || — || August 29, 2008 || La Sagra || OAM Obs. || — || align=right | 3.7 km || 
|-id=447 bgcolor=#d6d6d6
| 418447 ||  || — || August 23, 2008 || Siding Spring || SSS || — || align=right | 4.0 km || 
|-id=448 bgcolor=#d6d6d6
| 418448 ||  || — || August 30, 2008 || Socorro || LINEAR || — || align=right | 3.0 km || 
|-id=449 bgcolor=#d6d6d6
| 418449 ||  || — || August 26, 2008 || Socorro || LINEAR || — || align=right | 3.2 km || 
|-id=450 bgcolor=#d6d6d6
| 418450 ||  || — || August 23, 2008 || Kitt Peak || Spacewatch || THM || align=right | 2.3 km || 
|-id=451 bgcolor=#d6d6d6
| 418451 ||  || — || August 24, 2008 || Kitt Peak || Spacewatch || EOS || align=right | 1.7 km || 
|-id=452 bgcolor=#d6d6d6
| 418452 ||  || — || September 2, 2008 || Kitt Peak || Spacewatch || — || align=right | 4.8 km || 
|-id=453 bgcolor=#d6d6d6
| 418453 ||  || — || September 2, 2008 || Kitt Peak || Spacewatch || THM || align=right | 1.9 km || 
|-id=454 bgcolor=#d6d6d6
| 418454 ||  || — || September 3, 2008 || Kitt Peak || Spacewatch || — || align=right | 2.5 km || 
|-id=455 bgcolor=#d6d6d6
| 418455 ||  || — || August 24, 2008 || Kitt Peak || Spacewatch || — || align=right | 2.7 km || 
|-id=456 bgcolor=#d6d6d6
| 418456 ||  || — || September 5, 2008 || Socorro || LINEAR || — || align=right | 3.4 km || 
|-id=457 bgcolor=#d6d6d6
| 418457 ||  || — || September 2, 2008 || Kitt Peak || Spacewatch || — || align=right | 2.8 km || 
|-id=458 bgcolor=#d6d6d6
| 418458 ||  || — || September 2, 2008 || Kitt Peak || Spacewatch || — || align=right | 2.2 km || 
|-id=459 bgcolor=#d6d6d6
| 418459 ||  || — || September 2, 2008 || Kitt Peak || Spacewatch || — || align=right | 3.2 km || 
|-id=460 bgcolor=#d6d6d6
| 418460 ||  || — || September 2, 2008 || Kitt Peak || Spacewatch || — || align=right | 2.9 km || 
|-id=461 bgcolor=#d6d6d6
| 418461 ||  || — || September 2, 2008 || Kitt Peak || Spacewatch || — || align=right | 3.7 km || 
|-id=462 bgcolor=#d6d6d6
| 418462 ||  || — || September 2, 2008 || Kitt Peak || Spacewatch || — || align=right | 2.3 km || 
|-id=463 bgcolor=#d6d6d6
| 418463 ||  || — || September 2, 2008 || Kitt Peak || Spacewatch || — || align=right | 2.7 km || 
|-id=464 bgcolor=#d6d6d6
| 418464 ||  || — || September 2, 2008 || Kitt Peak || Spacewatch || — || align=right | 2.1 km || 
|-id=465 bgcolor=#d6d6d6
| 418465 ||  || — || September 21, 2003 || Kitt Peak || Spacewatch || — || align=right | 2.8 km || 
|-id=466 bgcolor=#d6d6d6
| 418466 ||  || — || July 29, 2008 || Mount Lemmon || Mount Lemmon Survey || — || align=right | 2.7 km || 
|-id=467 bgcolor=#d6d6d6
| 418467 ||  || — || September 3, 2008 || Kitt Peak || Spacewatch || — || align=right | 2.4 km || 
|-id=468 bgcolor=#d6d6d6
| 418468 ||  || — || September 3, 2008 || Kitt Peak || Spacewatch || — || align=right | 2.4 km || 
|-id=469 bgcolor=#d6d6d6
| 418469 ||  || — || September 4, 2008 || Kitt Peak || Spacewatch || — || align=right | 3.5 km || 
|-id=470 bgcolor=#d6d6d6
| 418470 ||  || — || September 5, 2008 || Kitt Peak || Spacewatch || VER || align=right | 2.6 km || 
|-id=471 bgcolor=#d6d6d6
| 418471 ||  || — || September 5, 2008 || Kitt Peak || Spacewatch || — || align=right | 2.6 km || 
|-id=472 bgcolor=#d6d6d6
| 418472 ||  || — || September 5, 2008 || Kitt Peak || Spacewatch || — || align=right | 2.9 km || 
|-id=473 bgcolor=#d6d6d6
| 418473 ||  || — || September 5, 2008 || Kitt Peak || Spacewatch || — || align=right | 3.7 km || 
|-id=474 bgcolor=#d6d6d6
| 418474 ||  || — || September 5, 2008 || Kitt Peak || Spacewatch || — || align=right | 2.1 km || 
|-id=475 bgcolor=#d6d6d6
| 418475 ||  || — || September 6, 2008 || Kitt Peak || Spacewatch || — || align=right | 2.5 km || 
|-id=476 bgcolor=#d6d6d6
| 418476 ||  || — || September 6, 2008 || Kitt Peak || Spacewatch || EOS || align=right | 1.6 km || 
|-id=477 bgcolor=#d6d6d6
| 418477 ||  || — || September 6, 2008 || Kitt Peak || Spacewatch || EOS || align=right | 1.9 km || 
|-id=478 bgcolor=#d6d6d6
| 418478 ||  || — || July 30, 2008 || Kitt Peak || Spacewatch || LIX || align=right | 3.5 km || 
|-id=479 bgcolor=#d6d6d6
| 418479 ||  || — || September 7, 2008 || Mount Lemmon || Mount Lemmon Survey || — || align=right | 3.3 km || 
|-id=480 bgcolor=#d6d6d6
| 418480 ||  || — || September 3, 2008 || Kitt Peak || Spacewatch || — || align=right | 2.6 km || 
|-id=481 bgcolor=#d6d6d6
| 418481 ||  || — || September 5, 2008 || Kitt Peak || Spacewatch || LIX || align=right | 3.6 km || 
|-id=482 bgcolor=#d6d6d6
| 418482 ||  || — || September 6, 2008 || Mount Lemmon || Mount Lemmon Survey || EOS || align=right | 1.7 km || 
|-id=483 bgcolor=#d6d6d6
| 418483 ||  || — || September 6, 2008 || Kitt Peak || Spacewatch || THM || align=right | 1.8 km || 
|-id=484 bgcolor=#d6d6d6
| 418484 ||  || — || September 6, 2008 || Siding Spring || SSS || — || align=right | 3.0 km || 
|-id=485 bgcolor=#d6d6d6
| 418485 ||  || — || September 7, 2008 || Mount Lemmon || Mount Lemmon Survey || — || align=right | 3.1 km || 
|-id=486 bgcolor=#d6d6d6
| 418486 ||  || — || September 4, 2008 || Kitt Peak || Spacewatch || — || align=right | 2.8 km || 
|-id=487 bgcolor=#d6d6d6
| 418487 ||  || — || September 5, 2008 || Kitt Peak || Spacewatch || (1298) || align=right | 2.6 km || 
|-id=488 bgcolor=#d6d6d6
| 418488 ||  || — || September 6, 2008 || Mount Lemmon || Mount Lemmon Survey || — || align=right | 4.4 km || 
|-id=489 bgcolor=#d6d6d6
| 418489 ||  || — || September 7, 2008 || Mount Lemmon || Mount Lemmon Survey || VER || align=right | 2.6 km || 
|-id=490 bgcolor=#d6d6d6
| 418490 ||  || — || September 9, 2008 || Mount Lemmon || Mount Lemmon Survey || EOS || align=right | 1.6 km || 
|-id=491 bgcolor=#d6d6d6
| 418491 ||  || — || September 3, 2008 || Kitt Peak || Spacewatch || — || align=right | 3.7 km || 
|-id=492 bgcolor=#d6d6d6
| 418492 ||  || — || September 6, 2008 || Kitt Peak || Spacewatch || EOS || align=right | 1.7 km || 
|-id=493 bgcolor=#d6d6d6
| 418493 ||  || — || September 8, 2008 || Kitt Peak || Spacewatch || KOR || align=right | 1.5 km || 
|-id=494 bgcolor=#d6d6d6
| 418494 ||  || — || September 7, 2008 || Mount Lemmon || Mount Lemmon Survey || EOS || align=right | 1.7 km || 
|-id=495 bgcolor=#d6d6d6
| 418495 ||  || — || September 2, 2008 || Kitt Peak || Spacewatch || — || align=right | 2.0 km || 
|-id=496 bgcolor=#d6d6d6
| 418496 ||  || — || September 8, 2008 || Bergisch Gladbach || W. Bickel || — || align=right | 3.0 km || 
|-id=497 bgcolor=#d6d6d6
| 418497 ||  || — || January 31, 2006 || Kitt Peak || Spacewatch || THM || align=right | 2.9 km || 
|-id=498 bgcolor=#d6d6d6
| 418498 ||  || — || September 6, 2008 || Kitt Peak || Spacewatch || — || align=right | 3.3 km || 
|-id=499 bgcolor=#d6d6d6
| 418499 ||  || — || September 5, 2008 || Kitt Peak || Spacewatch || EOS || align=right | 1.7 km || 
|-id=500 bgcolor=#d6d6d6
| 418500 ||  || — || September 6, 2008 || Kitt Peak || Spacewatch || — || align=right | 2.3 km || 
|}

418501–418600 

|-bgcolor=#d6d6d6
| 418501 ||  || — || September 6, 2008 || Mount Lemmon || Mount Lemmon Survey || — || align=right | 3.7 km || 
|-id=502 bgcolor=#d6d6d6
| 418502 ||  || — || September 6, 2008 || Kitt Peak || Spacewatch || — || align=right | 2.6 km || 
|-id=503 bgcolor=#d6d6d6
| 418503 ||  || — || September 7, 2008 || Mount Lemmon || Mount Lemmon Survey || — || align=right | 2.3 km || 
|-id=504 bgcolor=#d6d6d6
| 418504 ||  || — || September 19, 2008 || Socorro || LINEAR || — || align=right | 3.7 km || 
|-id=505 bgcolor=#fefefe
| 418505 ||  || — || September 7, 2008 || Catalina || CSS || — || align=right data-sort-value="0.85" | 850 m || 
|-id=506 bgcolor=#d6d6d6
| 418506 ||  || — || September 22, 2008 || Socorro || LINEAR || — || align=right | 4.5 km || 
|-id=507 bgcolor=#d6d6d6
| 418507 ||  || — || August 21, 2008 || Kitt Peak || Spacewatch || — || align=right | 2.2 km || 
|-id=508 bgcolor=#d6d6d6
| 418508 ||  || — || September 19, 2008 || Kitt Peak || Spacewatch || EOS || align=right | 1.8 km || 
|-id=509 bgcolor=#d6d6d6
| 418509 ||  || — || September 20, 2008 || Kitt Peak || Spacewatch || — || align=right | 2.3 km || 
|-id=510 bgcolor=#d6d6d6
| 418510 ||  || — || September 6, 2008 || Mount Lemmon || Mount Lemmon Survey || — || align=right | 2.3 km || 
|-id=511 bgcolor=#d6d6d6
| 418511 ||  || — || September 20, 2008 || Kitt Peak || Spacewatch || VER || align=right | 2.8 km || 
|-id=512 bgcolor=#d6d6d6
| 418512 ||  || — || September 20, 2008 || Kitt Peak || Spacewatch || EOS || align=right | 2.1 km || 
|-id=513 bgcolor=#d6d6d6
| 418513 ||  || — || September 20, 2008 || Kitt Peak || Spacewatch || THM || align=right | 2.2 km || 
|-id=514 bgcolor=#d6d6d6
| 418514 ||  || — || September 20, 2008 || Catalina || CSS || EOS || align=right | 1.9 km || 
|-id=515 bgcolor=#d6d6d6
| 418515 ||  || — || September 6, 2008 || Mount Lemmon || Mount Lemmon Survey || THM || align=right | 2.2 km || 
|-id=516 bgcolor=#d6d6d6
| 418516 ||  || — || March 9, 2005 || Mount Lemmon || Mount Lemmon Survey || TIR || align=right | 2.9 km || 
|-id=517 bgcolor=#d6d6d6
| 418517 ||  || — || September 6, 2008 || Mount Lemmon || Mount Lemmon Survey || — || align=right | 2.4 km || 
|-id=518 bgcolor=#d6d6d6
| 418518 ||  || — || October 5, 2002 || Apache Point || SDSS || THM || align=right | 2.0 km || 
|-id=519 bgcolor=#d6d6d6
| 418519 ||  || — || September 20, 2008 || Kitt Peak || Spacewatch || VER || align=right | 3.3 km || 
|-id=520 bgcolor=#d6d6d6
| 418520 ||  || — || September 20, 2008 || Kitt Peak || Spacewatch || EOS || align=right | 2.2 km || 
|-id=521 bgcolor=#d6d6d6
| 418521 ||  || — || September 20, 2008 || Catalina || CSS || — || align=right | 2.7 km || 
|-id=522 bgcolor=#d6d6d6
| 418522 ||  || — || September 20, 2008 || Catalina || CSS || — || align=right | 3.8 km || 
|-id=523 bgcolor=#d6d6d6
| 418523 ||  || — || September 21, 2008 || Kitt Peak || Spacewatch || Tj (2.99) || align=right | 4.2 km || 
|-id=524 bgcolor=#d6d6d6
| 418524 ||  || — || September 21, 2008 || Kitt Peak || Spacewatch || — || align=right | 3.3 km || 
|-id=525 bgcolor=#d6d6d6
| 418525 ||  || — || September 9, 2008 || Mount Lemmon || Mount Lemmon Survey || — || align=right | 3.4 km || 
|-id=526 bgcolor=#d6d6d6
| 418526 ||  || — || September 21, 2008 || Mount Lemmon || Mount Lemmon Survey || Tj (2.99) || align=right | 4.0 km || 
|-id=527 bgcolor=#d6d6d6
| 418527 ||  || — || September 22, 2008 || Kitt Peak || Spacewatch || — || align=right | 3.6 km || 
|-id=528 bgcolor=#d6d6d6
| 418528 ||  || — || September 22, 2008 || Catalina || CSS || — || align=right | 4.0 km || 
|-id=529 bgcolor=#d6d6d6
| 418529 ||  || — || September 21, 2003 || Kitt Peak || Spacewatch || — || align=right | 3.4 km || 
|-id=530 bgcolor=#d6d6d6
| 418530 ||  || — || September 23, 2008 || Mount Lemmon || Mount Lemmon Survey || — || align=right | 2.5 km || 
|-id=531 bgcolor=#d6d6d6
| 418531 ||  || — || November 29, 2003 || Kitt Peak || Spacewatch || — || align=right | 2.9 km || 
|-id=532 bgcolor=#d6d6d6
| 418532 Saruman ||  ||  || September 27, 2008 || Taunus || E. Schwab, U. Zimmer || — || align=right | 2.4 km || 
|-id=533 bgcolor=#d6d6d6
| 418533 ||  || — || September 20, 2008 || Kitt Peak || Spacewatch || — || align=right | 2.1 km || 
|-id=534 bgcolor=#d6d6d6
| 418534 ||  || — || September 20, 2008 || Catalina || CSS || — || align=right | 4.0 km || 
|-id=535 bgcolor=#d6d6d6
| 418535 ||  || — || September 20, 2008 || Catalina || CSS || — || align=right | 2.3 km || 
|-id=536 bgcolor=#d6d6d6
| 418536 ||  || — || September 21, 2008 || Kitt Peak || Spacewatch || — || align=right | 3.3 km || 
|-id=537 bgcolor=#d6d6d6
| 418537 ||  || — || September 21, 2008 || Kitt Peak || Spacewatch || — || align=right | 2.2 km || 
|-id=538 bgcolor=#d6d6d6
| 418538 ||  || — || September 21, 2008 || Kitt Peak || Spacewatch || — || align=right | 3.4 km || 
|-id=539 bgcolor=#d6d6d6
| 418539 ||  || — || September 21, 2008 || Kitt Peak || Spacewatch || — || align=right | 2.3 km || 
|-id=540 bgcolor=#d6d6d6
| 418540 ||  || — || September 21, 2008 || Mount Lemmon || Mount Lemmon Survey || — || align=right | 3.0 km || 
|-id=541 bgcolor=#d6d6d6
| 418541 ||  || — || September 21, 2008 || Kitt Peak || Spacewatch || HYG || align=right | 2.6 km || 
|-id=542 bgcolor=#d6d6d6
| 418542 ||  || — || September 21, 2008 || Kitt Peak || Spacewatch || — || align=right | 4.5 km || 
|-id=543 bgcolor=#d6d6d6
| 418543 ||  || — || September 21, 2008 || Kitt Peak || Spacewatch || — || align=right | 3.4 km || 
|-id=544 bgcolor=#d6d6d6
| 418544 ||  || — || September 21, 2008 || Kitt Peak || Spacewatch || — || align=right | 3.6 km || 
|-id=545 bgcolor=#d6d6d6
| 418545 ||  || — || September 9, 2008 || Kitt Peak || Spacewatch || VER || align=right | 2.2 km || 
|-id=546 bgcolor=#d6d6d6
| 418546 ||  || — || September 22, 2008 || Kitt Peak || Spacewatch || — || align=right | 3.1 km || 
|-id=547 bgcolor=#d6d6d6
| 418547 ||  || — || September 22, 2008 || Kitt Peak || Spacewatch || — || align=right | 3.3 km || 
|-id=548 bgcolor=#d6d6d6
| 418548 ||  || — || September 22, 2008 || Kitt Peak || Spacewatch || — || align=right | 3.1 km || 
|-id=549 bgcolor=#d6d6d6
| 418549 ||  || — || September 22, 2008 || Kitt Peak || Spacewatch || — || align=right | 5.1 km || 
|-id=550 bgcolor=#d6d6d6
| 418550 ||  || — || September 22, 2008 || Mount Lemmon || Mount Lemmon Survey || EOS || align=right | 2.2 km || 
|-id=551 bgcolor=#d6d6d6
| 418551 ||  || — || September 22, 2008 || Mount Lemmon || Mount Lemmon Survey || THM || align=right | 1.8 km || 
|-id=552 bgcolor=#d6d6d6
| 418552 ||  || — || September 22, 2008 || Mount Lemmon || Mount Lemmon Survey || — || align=right | 2.9 km || 
|-id=553 bgcolor=#d6d6d6
| 418553 ||  || — || September 22, 2008 || Mount Lemmon || Mount Lemmon Survey || — || align=right | 3.1 km || 
|-id=554 bgcolor=#d6d6d6
| 418554 ||  || — || September 22, 2008 || Mount Lemmon || Mount Lemmon Survey || HYG || align=right | 3.0 km || 
|-id=555 bgcolor=#d6d6d6
| 418555 ||  || — || September 6, 2008 || Mount Lemmon || Mount Lemmon Survey || — || align=right | 2.5 km || 
|-id=556 bgcolor=#d6d6d6
| 418556 ||  || — || September 22, 2008 || Mount Lemmon || Mount Lemmon Survey || THM || align=right | 2.1 km || 
|-id=557 bgcolor=#d6d6d6
| 418557 ||  || — || September 22, 2008 || Mount Lemmon || Mount Lemmon Survey || THM || align=right | 2.0 km || 
|-id=558 bgcolor=#d6d6d6
| 418558 ||  || — || September 22, 2008 || Mount Lemmon || Mount Lemmon Survey || — || align=right | 2.3 km || 
|-id=559 bgcolor=#d6d6d6
| 418559 ||  || — || September 22, 2008 || Kitt Peak || Spacewatch || — || align=right | 2.9 km || 
|-id=560 bgcolor=#d6d6d6
| 418560 ||  || — || October 5, 2002 || Apache Point || SDSS || — || align=right | 2.7 km || 
|-id=561 bgcolor=#d6d6d6
| 418561 ||  || — || September 24, 2008 || Catalina || CSS || — || align=right | 3.6 km || 
|-id=562 bgcolor=#d6d6d6
| 418562 ||  || — || September 24, 2008 || Mount Lemmon || Mount Lemmon Survey || EOS || align=right | 2.0 km || 
|-id=563 bgcolor=#d6d6d6
| 418563 ||  || — || September 6, 2008 || Mount Lemmon || Mount Lemmon Survey || — || align=right | 2.8 km || 
|-id=564 bgcolor=#d6d6d6
| 418564 ||  || — || September 25, 2008 || Kitt Peak || Spacewatch || HYG || align=right | 2.9 km || 
|-id=565 bgcolor=#d6d6d6
| 418565 ||  || — || November 24, 2003 || Kitt Peak || Spacewatch || LIX || align=right | 4.0 km || 
|-id=566 bgcolor=#d6d6d6
| 418566 ||  || — || September 22, 2008 || Socorro || LINEAR || — || align=right | 3.7 km || 
|-id=567 bgcolor=#d6d6d6
| 418567 ||  || — || September 22, 2008 || Socorro || LINEAR || — || align=right | 4.0 km || 
|-id=568 bgcolor=#d6d6d6
| 418568 ||  || — || September 23, 2008 || Socorro || LINEAR || Tj (2.99) || align=right | 3.8 km || 
|-id=569 bgcolor=#d6d6d6
| 418569 ||  || — || August 24, 2008 || Kitt Peak || Spacewatch || — || align=right | 2.9 km || 
|-id=570 bgcolor=#d6d6d6
| 418570 ||  || — || September 28, 2008 || Socorro || LINEAR || — || align=right | 4.3 km || 
|-id=571 bgcolor=#d6d6d6
| 418571 ||  || — || September 21, 2008 || Mount Lemmon || Mount Lemmon Survey || — || align=right | 3.2 km || 
|-id=572 bgcolor=#d6d6d6
| 418572 ||  || — || September 22, 2008 || Mount Lemmon || Mount Lemmon Survey || EOS || align=right | 3.4 km || 
|-id=573 bgcolor=#d6d6d6
| 418573 ||  || — || September 8, 2002 || Haleakala || NEAT || — || align=right | 2.6 km || 
|-id=574 bgcolor=#d6d6d6
| 418574 ||  || — || July 30, 2008 || Mount Lemmon || Mount Lemmon Survey || EOS || align=right | 2.1 km || 
|-id=575 bgcolor=#d6d6d6
| 418575 ||  || — || September 24, 2008 || Kitt Peak || Spacewatch || — || align=right | 3.1 km || 
|-id=576 bgcolor=#d6d6d6
| 418576 ||  || — || September 7, 2008 || Mount Lemmon || Mount Lemmon Survey || — || align=right | 2.6 km || 
|-id=577 bgcolor=#d6d6d6
| 418577 ||  || — || September 25, 2008 || Kitt Peak || Spacewatch || TIR || align=right | 2.6 km || 
|-id=578 bgcolor=#d6d6d6
| 418578 ||  || — || September 25, 2008 || Kitt Peak || Spacewatch || LIX || align=right | 3.2 km || 
|-id=579 bgcolor=#d6d6d6
| 418579 ||  || — || September 25, 2008 || Kitt Peak || Spacewatch || HYG || align=right | 2.3 km || 
|-id=580 bgcolor=#d6d6d6
| 418580 ||  || — || September 26, 2008 || Kitt Peak || Spacewatch || — || align=right | 2.7 km || 
|-id=581 bgcolor=#d6d6d6
| 418581 ||  || — || September 26, 2008 || Kitt Peak || Spacewatch || — || align=right | 2.9 km || 
|-id=582 bgcolor=#d6d6d6
| 418582 ||  || — || September 26, 2008 || Kitt Peak || Spacewatch || — || align=right | 2.6 km || 
|-id=583 bgcolor=#d6d6d6
| 418583 ||  || — || September 26, 2008 || Kitt Peak || Spacewatch || — || align=right | 2.5 km || 
|-id=584 bgcolor=#d6d6d6
| 418584 ||  || — || September 28, 2008 || Mount Lemmon || Mount Lemmon Survey || VER || align=right | 2.9 km || 
|-id=585 bgcolor=#d6d6d6
| 418585 ||  || — || September 29, 2008 || Mount Lemmon || Mount Lemmon Survey || — || align=right | 2.8 km || 
|-id=586 bgcolor=#d6d6d6
| 418586 ||  || — || September 30, 2008 || La Sagra || OAM Obs. || — || align=right | 2.5 km || 
|-id=587 bgcolor=#d6d6d6
| 418587 ||  || — || September 28, 2008 || Mount Lemmon || Mount Lemmon Survey || — || align=right | 3.7 km || 
|-id=588 bgcolor=#d6d6d6
| 418588 ||  || — || September 28, 2008 || Mount Lemmon || Mount Lemmon Survey || — || align=right | 2.6 km || 
|-id=589 bgcolor=#d6d6d6
| 418589 ||  || — || September 19, 2008 || Kitt Peak || Spacewatch || — || align=right | 3.2 km || 
|-id=590 bgcolor=#d6d6d6
| 418590 ||  || — || September 29, 2008 || Kitt Peak || Spacewatch || — || align=right | 3.0 km || 
|-id=591 bgcolor=#d6d6d6
| 418591 ||  || — || September 29, 2008 || Catalina || CSS || — || align=right | 2.6 km || 
|-id=592 bgcolor=#d6d6d6
| 418592 ||  || — || September 6, 2008 || Mount Lemmon || Mount Lemmon Survey || — || align=right | 3.1 km || 
|-id=593 bgcolor=#d6d6d6
| 418593 ||  || — || September 30, 2008 || Catalina || CSS || — || align=right | 3.4 km || 
|-id=594 bgcolor=#d6d6d6
| 418594 ||  || — || September 20, 2008 || Kitt Peak || Spacewatch || — || align=right | 2.4 km || 
|-id=595 bgcolor=#d6d6d6
| 418595 ||  || — || September 22, 2008 || Kitt Peak || Spacewatch || — || align=right | 3.4 km || 
|-id=596 bgcolor=#d6d6d6
| 418596 ||  || — || September 22, 2008 || Kitt Peak || Spacewatch || — || align=right | 3.0 km || 
|-id=597 bgcolor=#d6d6d6
| 418597 ||  || — || October 21, 2003 || Kitt Peak || Spacewatch || EOS || align=right | 1.7 km || 
|-id=598 bgcolor=#d6d6d6
| 418598 ||  || — || September 23, 2008 || Mount Lemmon || Mount Lemmon Survey || — || align=right | 2.5 km || 
|-id=599 bgcolor=#E9E9E9
| 418599 ||  || — || January 31, 2006 || Kitt Peak || Spacewatch || — || align=right | 2.5 km || 
|-id=600 bgcolor=#d6d6d6
| 418600 ||  || — || September 23, 2008 || Kitt Peak || Spacewatch || — || align=right | 3.1 km || 
|}

418601–418700 

|-bgcolor=#d6d6d6
| 418601 ||  || — || September 24, 2008 || Kitt Peak || Spacewatch || THM || align=right | 2.3 km || 
|-id=602 bgcolor=#d6d6d6
| 418602 ||  || — || September 29, 2008 || Kitt Peak || Spacewatch || — || align=right | 3.6 km || 
|-id=603 bgcolor=#d6d6d6
| 418603 ||  || — || September 22, 2008 || Mount Lemmon || Mount Lemmon Survey || — || align=right | 3.1 km || 
|-id=604 bgcolor=#d6d6d6
| 418604 ||  || — || September 25, 2008 || Kitt Peak || Spacewatch || — || align=right | 3.1 km || 
|-id=605 bgcolor=#d6d6d6
| 418605 ||  || — || September 29, 2008 || Kitt Peak || Spacewatch || THM || align=right | 2.1 km || 
|-id=606 bgcolor=#d6d6d6
| 418606 ||  || — || September 20, 2008 || Kitt Peak || Spacewatch || EOS || align=right | 2.2 km || 
|-id=607 bgcolor=#d6d6d6
| 418607 ||  || — || December 19, 2003 || Kitt Peak || Spacewatch || — || align=right | 2.4 km || 
|-id=608 bgcolor=#d6d6d6
| 418608 ||  || — || September 25, 2008 || Kitt Peak || Spacewatch || — || align=right | 3.1 km || 
|-id=609 bgcolor=#d6d6d6
| 418609 ||  || — || September 24, 2008 || Mount Lemmon || Mount Lemmon Survey || — || align=right | 3.9 km || 
|-id=610 bgcolor=#d6d6d6
| 418610 ||  || — || September 23, 2008 || Catalina || CSS || — || align=right | 3.9 km || 
|-id=611 bgcolor=#d6d6d6
| 418611 ||  || — || March 16, 2005 || Mount Lemmon || Mount Lemmon Survey || — || align=right | 3.0 km || 
|-id=612 bgcolor=#d6d6d6
| 418612 ||  || — || September 24, 2008 || Catalina || CSS || — || align=right | 3.9 km || 
|-id=613 bgcolor=#d6d6d6
| 418613 ||  || — || September 21, 2008 || Catalina || CSS || — || align=right | 3.5 km || 
|-id=614 bgcolor=#d6d6d6
| 418614 ||  || — || September 22, 2008 || Catalina || CSS || TIR || align=right | 4.1 km || 
|-id=615 bgcolor=#E9E9E9
| 418615 ||  || — || September 23, 2008 || Socorro || LINEAR || — || align=right | 2.8 km || 
|-id=616 bgcolor=#d6d6d6
| 418616 ||  || — || September 23, 2008 || Catalina || CSS || — || align=right | 3.8 km || 
|-id=617 bgcolor=#d6d6d6
| 418617 ||  || — || September 23, 2008 || Mount Lemmon || Mount Lemmon Survey || — || align=right | 2.6 km || 
|-id=618 bgcolor=#d6d6d6
| 418618 ||  || — || September 30, 2008 || Catalina || CSS || — || align=right | 3.0 km || 
|-id=619 bgcolor=#d6d6d6
| 418619 ||  || — || October 3, 2008 || La Sagra || OAM Obs. || THB || align=right | 2.9 km || 
|-id=620 bgcolor=#d6d6d6
| 418620 ||  || — || October 3, 2008 || La Sagra || OAM Obs. || — || align=right | 2.8 km || 
|-id=621 bgcolor=#d6d6d6
| 418621 ||  || — || September 23, 2008 || Kitt Peak || Spacewatch || — || align=right | 2.6 km || 
|-id=622 bgcolor=#d6d6d6
| 418622 ||  || — || October 1, 2008 || Mount Lemmon || Mount Lemmon Survey || — || align=right | 2.4 km || 
|-id=623 bgcolor=#d6d6d6
| 418623 ||  || — || September 22, 2008 || Mount Lemmon || Mount Lemmon Survey || EOS || align=right | 1.8 km || 
|-id=624 bgcolor=#d6d6d6
| 418624 ||  || — || October 1, 2008 || Kitt Peak || Spacewatch || — || align=right | 4.7 km || 
|-id=625 bgcolor=#d6d6d6
| 418625 ||  || — || October 1, 2008 || Kitt Peak || Spacewatch || — || align=right | 2.5 km || 
|-id=626 bgcolor=#d6d6d6
| 418626 ||  || — || October 1, 2008 || Kitt Peak || Spacewatch || — || align=right | 2.7 km || 
|-id=627 bgcolor=#d6d6d6
| 418627 ||  || — || September 7, 2008 || Mount Lemmon || Mount Lemmon Survey || — || align=right | 3.2 km || 
|-id=628 bgcolor=#d6d6d6
| 418628 ||  || — || August 24, 2008 || Kitt Peak || Spacewatch || 7:4 || align=right | 3.8 km || 
|-id=629 bgcolor=#d6d6d6
| 418629 ||  || — || October 1, 2008 || Mount Lemmon || Mount Lemmon Survey || — || align=right | 2.7 km || 
|-id=630 bgcolor=#d6d6d6
| 418630 ||  || — || September 2, 2008 || Kitt Peak || Spacewatch || — || align=right | 2.5 km || 
|-id=631 bgcolor=#d6d6d6
| 418631 ||  || — || October 1, 2008 || Mount Lemmon || Mount Lemmon Survey || — || align=right | 5.4 km || 
|-id=632 bgcolor=#d6d6d6
| 418632 ||  || — || October 1, 2008 || Mount Lemmon || Mount Lemmon Survey || — || align=right | 2.7 km || 
|-id=633 bgcolor=#d6d6d6
| 418633 ||  || — || October 1, 2008 || Mount Lemmon || Mount Lemmon Survey || — || align=right | 3.4 km || 
|-id=634 bgcolor=#d6d6d6
| 418634 ||  || — || October 1, 2008 || Kitt Peak || Spacewatch || VER || align=right | 3.7 km || 
|-id=635 bgcolor=#d6d6d6
| 418635 ||  || — || October 1, 2008 || Kitt Peak || Spacewatch || — || align=right | 2.2 km || 
|-id=636 bgcolor=#d6d6d6
| 418636 ||  || — || October 2, 2008 || Kitt Peak || Spacewatch || — || align=right | 2.8 km || 
|-id=637 bgcolor=#d6d6d6
| 418637 ||  || — || October 2, 2008 || Kitt Peak || Spacewatch || — || align=right | 3.8 km || 
|-id=638 bgcolor=#d6d6d6
| 418638 ||  || — || September 24, 2008 || Kitt Peak || Spacewatch || — || align=right | 4.3 km || 
|-id=639 bgcolor=#d6d6d6
| 418639 ||  || — || October 2, 2008 || Kitt Peak || Spacewatch || THM || align=right | 2.2 km || 
|-id=640 bgcolor=#d6d6d6
| 418640 ||  || — || October 2, 2008 || Kitt Peak || Spacewatch || — || align=right | 1.9 km || 
|-id=641 bgcolor=#d6d6d6
| 418641 ||  || — || September 20, 2008 || Kitt Peak || Spacewatch || THM || align=right | 1.8 km || 
|-id=642 bgcolor=#d6d6d6
| 418642 ||  || — || September 24, 2008 || Kitt Peak || Spacewatch || — || align=right | 2.6 km || 
|-id=643 bgcolor=#d6d6d6
| 418643 ||  || — || October 2, 2008 || Kitt Peak || Spacewatch || EMA || align=right | 4.1 km || 
|-id=644 bgcolor=#d6d6d6
| 418644 ||  || — || October 2, 2008 || Kitt Peak || Spacewatch || — || align=right | 2.9 km || 
|-id=645 bgcolor=#d6d6d6
| 418645 ||  || — || September 22, 2008 || Mount Lemmon || Mount Lemmon Survey || EOS || align=right | 1.6 km || 
|-id=646 bgcolor=#d6d6d6
| 418646 ||  || — || October 2, 2008 || Catalina || CSS || — || align=right | 3.1 km || 
|-id=647 bgcolor=#d6d6d6
| 418647 ||  || — || October 2, 2008 || Kitt Peak || Spacewatch || — || align=right | 2.9 km || 
|-id=648 bgcolor=#d6d6d6
| 418648 ||  || — || October 2, 2008 || Kitt Peak || Spacewatch || — || align=right | 3.8 km || 
|-id=649 bgcolor=#d6d6d6
| 418649 ||  || — || October 2, 2008 || Mount Lemmon || Mount Lemmon Survey || THM || align=right | 1.9 km || 
|-id=650 bgcolor=#d6d6d6
| 418650 ||  || — || September 3, 2008 || Kitt Peak || Spacewatch || — || align=right | 2.7 km || 
|-id=651 bgcolor=#d6d6d6
| 418651 ||  || — || September 7, 2008 || Mount Lemmon || Mount Lemmon Survey || — || align=right | 2.8 km || 
|-id=652 bgcolor=#d6d6d6
| 418652 ||  || — || October 3, 2008 || Kitt Peak || Spacewatch || — || align=right | 2.3 km || 
|-id=653 bgcolor=#d6d6d6
| 418653 ||  || — || October 3, 2008 || Kitt Peak || Spacewatch || — || align=right | 3.8 km || 
|-id=654 bgcolor=#d6d6d6
| 418654 ||  || — || September 24, 2008 || Kitt Peak || Spacewatch || — || align=right | 2.3 km || 
|-id=655 bgcolor=#d6d6d6
| 418655 ||  || — || September 25, 2008 || Kitt Peak || Spacewatch || HYG || align=right | 2.5 km || 
|-id=656 bgcolor=#d6d6d6
| 418656 ||  || — || October 4, 2008 || La Sagra || OAM Obs. || — || align=right | 2.5 km || 
|-id=657 bgcolor=#d6d6d6
| 418657 ||  || — || September 3, 2008 || Kitt Peak || Spacewatch || THM || align=right | 1.9 km || 
|-id=658 bgcolor=#d6d6d6
| 418658 ||  || — || April 26, 2001 || Kitt Peak || Spacewatch || EOS || align=right | 2.2 km || 
|-id=659 bgcolor=#d6d6d6
| 418659 ||  || — || September 6, 2008 || Mount Lemmon || Mount Lemmon Survey || EOS || align=right | 1.9 km || 
|-id=660 bgcolor=#d6d6d6
| 418660 ||  || — || October 6, 2008 || Kitt Peak || Spacewatch || — || align=right | 4.5 km || 
|-id=661 bgcolor=#d6d6d6
| 418661 ||  || — || October 6, 2008 || Catalina || CSS || — || align=right | 2.9 km || 
|-id=662 bgcolor=#d6d6d6
| 418662 ||  || — || September 2, 2008 || Kitt Peak || Spacewatch || — || align=right | 2.8 km || 
|-id=663 bgcolor=#d6d6d6
| 418663 ||  || — || October 7, 2008 || Kitt Peak || Spacewatch || EOS || align=right | 1.6 km || 
|-id=664 bgcolor=#d6d6d6
| 418664 ||  || — || October 8, 2008 || Mount Lemmon || Mount Lemmon Survey || — || align=right | 2.7 km || 
|-id=665 bgcolor=#d6d6d6
| 418665 ||  || — || October 8, 2008 || Mount Lemmon || Mount Lemmon Survey || — || align=right | 3.2 km || 
|-id=666 bgcolor=#d6d6d6
| 418666 ||  || — || October 8, 2008 || Mount Lemmon || Mount Lemmon Survey || EOS || align=right | 1.6 km || 
|-id=667 bgcolor=#d6d6d6
| 418667 ||  || — || October 8, 2008 || Mount Lemmon || Mount Lemmon Survey || — || align=right | 2.6 km || 
|-id=668 bgcolor=#d6d6d6
| 418668 ||  || — || October 8, 2008 || Mount Lemmon || Mount Lemmon Survey || — || align=right | 4.0 km || 
|-id=669 bgcolor=#d6d6d6
| 418669 ||  || — || October 8, 2008 || Mount Lemmon || Mount Lemmon Survey || — || align=right | 3.9 km || 
|-id=670 bgcolor=#d6d6d6
| 418670 ||  || — || September 23, 2008 || Kitt Peak || Spacewatch || VER || align=right | 2.9 km || 
|-id=671 bgcolor=#d6d6d6
| 418671 ||  || — || October 8, 2008 || Mount Lemmon || Mount Lemmon Survey || — || align=right | 2.7 km || 
|-id=672 bgcolor=#d6d6d6
| 418672 ||  || — || September 23, 2008 || Kitt Peak || Spacewatch || — || align=right | 3.0 km || 
|-id=673 bgcolor=#d6d6d6
| 418673 ||  || — || October 9, 2008 || Mount Lemmon || Mount Lemmon Survey || EOS || align=right | 1.7 km || 
|-id=674 bgcolor=#d6d6d6
| 418674 ||  || — || October 9, 2008 || Mount Lemmon || Mount Lemmon Survey || — || align=right | 3.5 km || 
|-id=675 bgcolor=#d6d6d6
| 418675 ||  || — || October 1, 2008 || Mount Lemmon || Mount Lemmon Survey || NAE || align=right | 3.4 km || 
|-id=676 bgcolor=#d6d6d6
| 418676 ||  || — || October 1, 2008 || Kitt Peak || Spacewatch || — || align=right | 2.8 km || 
|-id=677 bgcolor=#d6d6d6
| 418677 ||  || — || October 8, 2008 || Mount Lemmon || Mount Lemmon Survey || — || align=right | 3.6 km || 
|-id=678 bgcolor=#d6d6d6
| 418678 ||  || — || October 1, 2008 || Kitt Peak || Spacewatch || — || align=right | 2.1 km || 
|-id=679 bgcolor=#d6d6d6
| 418679 ||  || — || October 6, 2008 || Mount Lemmon || Mount Lemmon Survey || — || align=right | 3.6 km || 
|-id=680 bgcolor=#d6d6d6
| 418680 ||  || — || October 6, 2008 || Catalina || CSS || — || align=right | 5.7 km || 
|-id=681 bgcolor=#d6d6d6
| 418681 ||  || — || October 9, 2008 || Mount Lemmon || Mount Lemmon Survey || THM || align=right | 2.5 km || 
|-id=682 bgcolor=#d6d6d6
| 418682 ||  || — || October 2, 2008 || Kitt Peak || Spacewatch || — || align=right | 2.6 km || 
|-id=683 bgcolor=#d6d6d6
| 418683 ||  || — || October 2, 2008 || Mount Lemmon || Mount Lemmon Survey || HYG || align=right | 2.5 km || 
|-id=684 bgcolor=#d6d6d6
| 418684 ||  || — || October 8, 2008 || Kitt Peak || Spacewatch || — || align=right | 2.7 km || 
|-id=685 bgcolor=#d6d6d6
| 418685 ||  || — || October 3, 2008 || Mount Lemmon || Mount Lemmon Survey || — || align=right | 3.2 km || 
|-id=686 bgcolor=#d6d6d6
| 418686 ||  || — || October 10, 2008 || Mount Lemmon || Mount Lemmon Survey || — || align=right | 3.9 km || 
|-id=687 bgcolor=#d6d6d6
| 418687 ||  || — || October 21, 2003 || Kitt Peak || Spacewatch || — || align=right | 2.8 km || 
|-id=688 bgcolor=#d6d6d6
| 418688 ||  || — || October 22, 2008 || Bergisch Gladbac || W. Bickel || — || align=right | 2.4 km || 
|-id=689 bgcolor=#d6d6d6
| 418689 Gema ||  ||  || October 24, 2008 || La Cañada || J. Lacruz || — || align=right | 4.3 km || 
|-id=690 bgcolor=#d6d6d6
| 418690 ||  || — || October 21, 2008 || Mount Lemmon || Mount Lemmon Survey || — || align=right | 4.4 km || 
|-id=691 bgcolor=#d6d6d6
| 418691 ||  || — || October 22, 2008 || Andrushivka || Andrushivka Obs. || — || align=right | 2.5 km || 
|-id=692 bgcolor=#d6d6d6
| 418692 ||  || — || October 17, 2008 || Kitt Peak || Spacewatch || — || align=right | 2.2 km || 
|-id=693 bgcolor=#d6d6d6
| 418693 ||  || — || October 2, 2008 || Mount Lemmon || Mount Lemmon Survey || — || align=right | 3.1 km || 
|-id=694 bgcolor=#d6d6d6
| 418694 ||  || — || September 24, 2008 || Kitt Peak || Spacewatch || — || align=right | 3.4 km || 
|-id=695 bgcolor=#d6d6d6
| 418695 ||  || — || October 17, 2008 || Kitt Peak || Spacewatch || — || align=right | 2.3 km || 
|-id=696 bgcolor=#d6d6d6
| 418696 ||  || — || October 18, 2008 || Kitt Peak || Spacewatch || EOS || align=right | 1.8 km || 
|-id=697 bgcolor=#d6d6d6
| 418697 ||  || — || October 18, 2008 || Kitt Peak || Spacewatch || — || align=right | 2.6 km || 
|-id=698 bgcolor=#d6d6d6
| 418698 ||  || — || October 18, 2008 || Kitt Peak || Spacewatch || — || align=right | 3.0 km || 
|-id=699 bgcolor=#d6d6d6
| 418699 ||  || — || October 7, 2008 || Kitt Peak || Spacewatch || EOS || align=right | 1.9 km || 
|-id=700 bgcolor=#d6d6d6
| 418700 ||  || — || October 20, 2008 || Kitt Peak || Spacewatch || — || align=right | 3.6 km || 
|}

418701–418800 

|-bgcolor=#d6d6d6
| 418701 ||  || — || October 20, 2008 || Kitt Peak || Spacewatch || THM || align=right | 2.1 km || 
|-id=702 bgcolor=#d6d6d6
| 418702 ||  || — || October 20, 2008 || Kitt Peak || Spacewatch || 7:4 || align=right | 4.8 km || 
|-id=703 bgcolor=#d6d6d6
| 418703 ||  || — || September 25, 2008 || Kitt Peak || Spacewatch || — || align=right | 2.7 km || 
|-id=704 bgcolor=#d6d6d6
| 418704 ||  || — || October 20, 2008 || Kitt Peak || Spacewatch || — || align=right | 3.1 km || 
|-id=705 bgcolor=#d6d6d6
| 418705 ||  || — || October 20, 2008 || Kitt Peak || Spacewatch || LIX || align=right | 3.4 km || 
|-id=706 bgcolor=#d6d6d6
| 418706 ||  || — || October 20, 2008 || Kitt Peak || Spacewatch || Tj (2.97) || align=right | 4.9 km || 
|-id=707 bgcolor=#E9E9E9
| 418707 ||  || — || October 20, 2008 || Kitt Peak || Spacewatch || — || align=right | 1.4 km || 
|-id=708 bgcolor=#d6d6d6
| 418708 ||  || — || October 20, 2008 || Kitt Peak || Spacewatch || — || align=right | 3.5 km || 
|-id=709 bgcolor=#d6d6d6
| 418709 ||  || — || October 2, 2008 || Kitt Peak || Spacewatch || — || align=right | 2.1 km || 
|-id=710 bgcolor=#d6d6d6
| 418710 ||  || — || October 20, 2008 || Mount Lemmon || Mount Lemmon Survey || — || align=right | 3.2 km || 
|-id=711 bgcolor=#d6d6d6
| 418711 ||  || — || October 20, 2008 || Kitt Peak || Spacewatch || — || align=right | 2.9 km || 
|-id=712 bgcolor=#d6d6d6
| 418712 ||  || — || October 21, 2008 || Kitt Peak || Spacewatch || VER || align=right | 4.6 km || 
|-id=713 bgcolor=#d6d6d6
| 418713 ||  || — || October 21, 2008 || Kitt Peak || Spacewatch || — || align=right | 3.1 km || 
|-id=714 bgcolor=#d6d6d6
| 418714 ||  || — || October 21, 2008 || Kitt Peak || Spacewatch || — || align=right | 4.0 km || 
|-id=715 bgcolor=#d6d6d6
| 418715 ||  || — || October 21, 2008 || Kitt Peak || Spacewatch || EOS || align=right | 2.0 km || 
|-id=716 bgcolor=#d6d6d6
| 418716 ||  || — || October 21, 2008 || Lulin || LUSS || — || align=right | 2.5 km || 
|-id=717 bgcolor=#d6d6d6
| 418717 ||  || — || October 22, 2008 || Kitt Peak || Spacewatch || — || align=right | 3.5 km || 
|-id=718 bgcolor=#d6d6d6
| 418718 ||  || — || October 8, 2008 || Mount Lemmon || Mount Lemmon Survey || — || align=right | 3.1 km || 
|-id=719 bgcolor=#d6d6d6
| 418719 ||  || — || October 8, 2008 || Mount Lemmon || Mount Lemmon Survey || EOS || align=right | 1.7 km || 
|-id=720 bgcolor=#d6d6d6
| 418720 ||  || — || October 24, 2008 || Črni Vrh || Črni Vrh || 7:4* || align=right | 4.6 km || 
|-id=721 bgcolor=#d6d6d6
| 418721 ||  || — || October 24, 2008 || Mount Lemmon || Mount Lemmon Survey || — || align=right | 3.0 km || 
|-id=722 bgcolor=#d6d6d6
| 418722 ||  || — || October 7, 2008 || Kitt Peak || Spacewatch || — || align=right | 2.4 km || 
|-id=723 bgcolor=#d6d6d6
| 418723 ||  || — || September 29, 2008 || Catalina || CSS || — || align=right | 2.9 km || 
|-id=724 bgcolor=#d6d6d6
| 418724 ||  || — || October 30, 2008 || Magdalena Ridge || W. H. Ryan || — || align=right | 2.8 km || 
|-id=725 bgcolor=#d6d6d6
| 418725 ||  || — || September 22, 2008 || Mount Lemmon || Mount Lemmon Survey || — || align=right | 2.0 km || 
|-id=726 bgcolor=#d6d6d6
| 418726 ||  || — || October 21, 2008 || Kitt Peak || Spacewatch || — || align=right | 3.5 km || 
|-id=727 bgcolor=#d6d6d6
| 418727 ||  || — || October 22, 2008 || Kitt Peak || Spacewatch || — || align=right | 2.4 km || 
|-id=728 bgcolor=#d6d6d6
| 418728 ||  || — || September 28, 2008 || Mount Lemmon || Mount Lemmon Survey || — || align=right | 3.2 km || 
|-id=729 bgcolor=#d6d6d6
| 418729 ||  || — || October 22, 2008 || Kitt Peak || Spacewatch || EOS || align=right | 2.1 km || 
|-id=730 bgcolor=#d6d6d6
| 418730 ||  || — || October 9, 2008 || Kitt Peak || Spacewatch || 7:4 || align=right | 2.5 km || 
|-id=731 bgcolor=#d6d6d6
| 418731 ||  || — || October 22, 2008 || Kitt Peak || Spacewatch || — || align=right | 2.4 km || 
|-id=732 bgcolor=#d6d6d6
| 418732 ||  || — || October 22, 2008 || Kitt Peak || Spacewatch || — || align=right | 3.9 km || 
|-id=733 bgcolor=#d6d6d6
| 418733 ||  || — || October 22, 2008 || Kitt Peak || Spacewatch || — || align=right | 4.5 km || 
|-id=734 bgcolor=#d6d6d6
| 418734 ||  || — || October 22, 2008 || Kitt Peak || Spacewatch || — || align=right | 3.4 km || 
|-id=735 bgcolor=#d6d6d6
| 418735 ||  || — || October 23, 2008 || Kitt Peak || Spacewatch || — || align=right | 2.2 km || 
|-id=736 bgcolor=#d6d6d6
| 418736 ||  || — || October 23, 2008 || Kitt Peak || Spacewatch || EOS || align=right | 3.6 km || 
|-id=737 bgcolor=#d6d6d6
| 418737 ||  || — || July 29, 2008 || Mount Lemmon || Mount Lemmon Survey || THM || align=right | 2.2 km || 
|-id=738 bgcolor=#d6d6d6
| 418738 ||  || — || October 23, 2008 || Kitt Peak || Spacewatch || — || align=right | 2.9 km || 
|-id=739 bgcolor=#d6d6d6
| 418739 ||  || — || October 23, 2008 || Kitt Peak || Spacewatch || — || align=right | 5.7 km || 
|-id=740 bgcolor=#d6d6d6
| 418740 ||  || — || October 23, 2008 || Kitt Peak || Spacewatch || THM || align=right | 2.2 km || 
|-id=741 bgcolor=#d6d6d6
| 418741 ||  || — || October 23, 2008 || Kitt Peak || Spacewatch || THM || align=right | 2.1 km || 
|-id=742 bgcolor=#d6d6d6
| 418742 ||  || — || October 23, 2008 || Kitt Peak || Spacewatch || — || align=right | 2.8 km || 
|-id=743 bgcolor=#d6d6d6
| 418743 ||  || — || October 23, 2008 || Mount Lemmon || Mount Lemmon Survey || THM || align=right | 2.2 km || 
|-id=744 bgcolor=#d6d6d6
| 418744 ||  || — || October 23, 2008 || Mount Lemmon || Mount Lemmon Survey || — || align=right | 3.1 km || 
|-id=745 bgcolor=#d6d6d6
| 418745 ||  || — || October 23, 2008 || Mount Lemmon || Mount Lemmon Survey || — || align=right | 2.9 km || 
|-id=746 bgcolor=#d6d6d6
| 418746 ||  || — || October 23, 2008 || Mount Lemmon || Mount Lemmon Survey || — || align=right | 4.3 km || 
|-id=747 bgcolor=#d6d6d6
| 418747 ||  || — || October 23, 2008 || Mount Lemmon || Mount Lemmon Survey || — || align=right | 2.7 km || 
|-id=748 bgcolor=#d6d6d6
| 418748 ||  || — || October 23, 2008 || Kitt Peak || Spacewatch || ELF || align=right | 3.9 km || 
|-id=749 bgcolor=#d6d6d6
| 418749 ||  || — || September 26, 2008 || Kitt Peak || Spacewatch || — || align=right | 3.0 km || 
|-id=750 bgcolor=#d6d6d6
| 418750 ||  || — || October 8, 2008 || Kitt Peak || Spacewatch || — || align=right | 2.7 km || 
|-id=751 bgcolor=#d6d6d6
| 418751 ||  || — || October 24, 2008 || Kitt Peak || Spacewatch || — || align=right | 2.9 km || 
|-id=752 bgcolor=#d6d6d6
| 418752 ||  || — || October 24, 2008 || Kitt Peak || Spacewatch || — || align=right | 3.8 km || 
|-id=753 bgcolor=#d6d6d6
| 418753 ||  || — || October 24, 2008 || Mount Lemmon || Mount Lemmon Survey || — || align=right | 2.5 km || 
|-id=754 bgcolor=#d6d6d6
| 418754 ||  || — || October 24, 2008 || Kitt Peak || Spacewatch || — || align=right | 3.4 km || 
|-id=755 bgcolor=#d6d6d6
| 418755 ||  || — || October 25, 2008 || Mount Lemmon || Mount Lemmon Survey || — || align=right | 4.0 km || 
|-id=756 bgcolor=#d6d6d6
| 418756 ||  || — || October 27, 2008 || Catalina || CSS || — || align=right | 4.4 km || 
|-id=757 bgcolor=#d6d6d6
| 418757 ||  || — || October 30, 2008 || Mount Lemmon || Mount Lemmon Survey || Tj (2.94) || align=right | 3.8 km || 
|-id=758 bgcolor=#d6d6d6
| 418758 ||  || — || September 27, 2008 || Mount Lemmon || Mount Lemmon Survey || — || align=right | 2.9 km || 
|-id=759 bgcolor=#d6d6d6
| 418759 ||  || — || October 20, 2008 || Kitt Peak || Spacewatch || — || align=right | 3.2 km || 
|-id=760 bgcolor=#d6d6d6
| 418760 ||  || — || October 23, 2008 || Kitt Peak || Spacewatch || — || align=right | 2.6 km || 
|-id=761 bgcolor=#d6d6d6
| 418761 ||  || — || October 23, 2008 || Kitt Peak || Spacewatch || — || align=right | 3.0 km || 
|-id=762 bgcolor=#d6d6d6
| 418762 ||  || — || October 23, 2008 || Kitt Peak || Spacewatch || — || align=right | 3.5 km || 
|-id=763 bgcolor=#d6d6d6
| 418763 ||  || — || October 25, 2008 || Kitt Peak || Spacewatch || — || align=right | 2.9 km || 
|-id=764 bgcolor=#d6d6d6
| 418764 ||  || — || October 25, 2008 || Kitt Peak || Spacewatch || — || align=right | 3.4 km || 
|-id=765 bgcolor=#d6d6d6
| 418765 ||  || — || October 25, 2008 || Kitt Peak || Spacewatch || — || align=right | 5.1 km || 
|-id=766 bgcolor=#d6d6d6
| 418766 ||  || — || October 26, 2008 || Kitt Peak || Spacewatch || — || align=right | 3.7 km || 
|-id=767 bgcolor=#d6d6d6
| 418767 ||  || — || October 26, 2008 || Kitt Peak || Spacewatch || TIR || align=right | 2.3 km || 
|-id=768 bgcolor=#d6d6d6
| 418768 ||  || — || October 22, 2008 || Kitt Peak || Spacewatch || — || align=right | 2.8 km || 
|-id=769 bgcolor=#d6d6d6
| 418769 ||  || — || October 27, 2008 || Kitt Peak || Spacewatch || — || align=right | 3.9 km || 
|-id=770 bgcolor=#d6d6d6
| 418770 ||  || — || October 27, 2008 || Kitt Peak || Spacewatch || — || align=right | 3.2 km || 
|-id=771 bgcolor=#d6d6d6
| 418771 ||  || — || October 27, 2008 || Kitt Peak || Spacewatch || Tj (2.99) || align=right | 6.5 km || 
|-id=772 bgcolor=#d6d6d6
| 418772 ||  || — || October 28, 2008 || Kitt Peak || Spacewatch || — || align=right | 3.1 km || 
|-id=773 bgcolor=#d6d6d6
| 418773 ||  || — || October 9, 2008 || Kitt Peak || Spacewatch || EOS || align=right | 2.5 km || 
|-id=774 bgcolor=#d6d6d6
| 418774 ||  || — || September 28, 2008 || Mount Lemmon || Mount Lemmon Survey || — || align=right | 4.1 km || 
|-id=775 bgcolor=#d6d6d6
| 418775 ||  || — || October 28, 2008 || Kitt Peak || Spacewatch || — || align=right | 2.5 km || 
|-id=776 bgcolor=#d6d6d6
| 418776 ||  || — || September 25, 2008 || Kitt Peak || Spacewatch || — || align=right | 3.4 km || 
|-id=777 bgcolor=#d6d6d6
| 418777 ||  || — || October 28, 2008 || Kitt Peak || Spacewatch || — || align=right | 3.2 km || 
|-id=778 bgcolor=#d6d6d6
| 418778 ||  || — || October 28, 2008 || Mount Lemmon || Mount Lemmon Survey || — || align=right | 3.2 km || 
|-id=779 bgcolor=#d6d6d6
| 418779 ||  || — || October 7, 2008 || Kitt Peak || Spacewatch || — || align=right | 3.9 km || 
|-id=780 bgcolor=#d6d6d6
| 418780 ||  || — || September 27, 2008 || Mount Lemmon || Mount Lemmon Survey || — || align=right | 3.1 km || 
|-id=781 bgcolor=#d6d6d6
| 418781 ||  || — || October 28, 2008 || Kitt Peak || Spacewatch || EOS || align=right | 2.1 km || 
|-id=782 bgcolor=#d6d6d6
| 418782 ||  || — || October 21, 2008 || Kitt Peak || Spacewatch || — || align=right | 3.3 km || 
|-id=783 bgcolor=#d6d6d6
| 418783 ||  || — || October 29, 2008 || Kitt Peak || Spacewatch || — || align=right | 3.6 km || 
|-id=784 bgcolor=#d6d6d6
| 418784 ||  || — || October 30, 2008 || Mount Lemmon || Mount Lemmon Survey || HYG || align=right | 2.5 km || 
|-id=785 bgcolor=#d6d6d6
| 418785 ||  || — || October 31, 2008 || Mount Lemmon || Mount Lemmon Survey || — || align=right | 2.9 km || 
|-id=786 bgcolor=#d6d6d6
| 418786 ||  || — || September 28, 2008 || Mount Lemmon || Mount Lemmon Survey || — || align=right | 2.5 km || 
|-id=787 bgcolor=#d6d6d6
| 418787 ||  || — || October 31, 2008 || Catalina || CSS || — || align=right | 3.2 km || 
|-id=788 bgcolor=#d6d6d6
| 418788 ||  || — || October 2, 2008 || Kitt Peak || Spacewatch || EOS || align=right | 1.8 km || 
|-id=789 bgcolor=#d6d6d6
| 418789 ||  || — || October 20, 2008 || Kitt Peak || Spacewatch || — || align=right | 3.1 km || 
|-id=790 bgcolor=#d6d6d6
| 418790 ||  || — || October 31, 2008 || Mount Lemmon || Mount Lemmon Survey || — || align=right | 3.4 km || 
|-id=791 bgcolor=#d6d6d6
| 418791 ||  || — || October 23, 2008 || Kitt Peak || Spacewatch || — || align=right | 2.8 km || 
|-id=792 bgcolor=#d6d6d6
| 418792 ||  || — || October 25, 2008 || Catalina || CSS || — || align=right | 3.6 km || 
|-id=793 bgcolor=#d6d6d6
| 418793 ||  || — || October 25, 2008 || Kitt Peak || Spacewatch || — || align=right | 3.5 km || 
|-id=794 bgcolor=#d6d6d6
| 418794 ||  || — || October 28, 2008 || Catalina || CSS || — || align=right | 5.5 km || 
|-id=795 bgcolor=#d6d6d6
| 418795 ||  || — || October 20, 2008 || Mount Lemmon || Mount Lemmon Survey || THM || align=right | 2.1 km || 
|-id=796 bgcolor=#d6d6d6
| 418796 ||  || — || October 20, 2008 || Mount Lemmon || Mount Lemmon Survey || — || align=right | 2.7 km || 
|-id=797 bgcolor=#FFC2E0
| 418797 ||  || — || November 1, 2008 || Socorro || LINEAR || ATE || align=right data-sort-value="0.7" | 700 m || 
|-id=798 bgcolor=#d6d6d6
| 418798 ||  || — || October 29, 2008 || Mount Lemmon || Mount Lemmon Survey || EOS || align=right | 2.2 km || 
|-id=799 bgcolor=#d6d6d6
| 418799 ||  || — || November 2, 2008 || Mount Lemmon || Mount Lemmon Survey || — || align=right | 3.3 km || 
|-id=800 bgcolor=#d6d6d6
| 418800 ||  || — || November 9, 2008 || La Sagra || OAM Obs. || — || align=right | 2.9 km || 
|}

418801–418900 

|-bgcolor=#d6d6d6
| 418801 ||  || — || November 1, 2008 || Kitt Peak || Spacewatch || THM || align=right | 2.1 km || 
|-id=802 bgcolor=#d6d6d6
| 418802 ||  || — || November 1, 2008 || Kitt Peak || Spacewatch || — || align=right | 2.4 km || 
|-id=803 bgcolor=#d6d6d6
| 418803 ||  || — || November 1, 2008 || Kitt Peak || Spacewatch || Tj (2.99) || align=right | 4.3 km || 
|-id=804 bgcolor=#d6d6d6
| 418804 ||  || — || November 1, 2008 || Mount Lemmon || Mount Lemmon Survey || — || align=right | 3.1 km || 
|-id=805 bgcolor=#d6d6d6
| 418805 ||  || — || September 23, 2008 || Mount Lemmon || Mount Lemmon Survey || — || align=right | 3.7 km || 
|-id=806 bgcolor=#d6d6d6
| 418806 ||  || — || November 2, 2008 || Kitt Peak || Spacewatch || — || align=right | 3.9 km || 
|-id=807 bgcolor=#d6d6d6
| 418807 ||  || — || November 2, 2008 || Kitt Peak || Spacewatch || — || align=right | 4.2 km || 
|-id=808 bgcolor=#d6d6d6
| 418808 ||  || — || November 2, 2008 || Kitt Peak || Spacewatch || — || align=right | 3.2 km || 
|-id=809 bgcolor=#d6d6d6
| 418809 ||  || — || November 2, 2008 || Kitt Peak || Spacewatch || — || align=right | 3.2 km || 
|-id=810 bgcolor=#d6d6d6
| 418810 ||  || — || October 7, 2008 || Mount Lemmon || Mount Lemmon Survey || — || align=right | 3.3 km || 
|-id=811 bgcolor=#d6d6d6
| 418811 ||  || — || November 29, 2003 || Kitt Peak || Spacewatch || EOS || align=right | 1.7 km || 
|-id=812 bgcolor=#d6d6d6
| 418812 ||  || — || November 2, 2008 || Catalina || CSS || — || align=right | 3.1 km || 
|-id=813 bgcolor=#d6d6d6
| 418813 ||  || — || November 2, 2008 || Kitt Peak || Spacewatch || — || align=right | 3.1 km || 
|-id=814 bgcolor=#d6d6d6
| 418814 ||  || — || October 22, 2008 || Kitt Peak || Spacewatch || — || align=right | 4.3 km || 
|-id=815 bgcolor=#d6d6d6
| 418815 ||  || — || November 3, 2008 || Kitt Peak || Spacewatch || EOS || align=right | 2.0 km || 
|-id=816 bgcolor=#d6d6d6
| 418816 ||  || — || October 20, 2008 || Kitt Peak || Spacewatch || THM || align=right | 2.0 km || 
|-id=817 bgcolor=#d6d6d6
| 418817 ||  || — || March 7, 2005 || Socorro || LINEAR || EOS || align=right | 2.6 km || 
|-id=818 bgcolor=#d6d6d6
| 418818 ||  || — || November 6, 2008 || Mount Lemmon || Mount Lemmon Survey || — || align=right | 2.9 km || 
|-id=819 bgcolor=#d6d6d6
| 418819 ||  || — || November 8, 2008 || Mount Lemmon || Mount Lemmon Survey || — || align=right | 3.7 km || 
|-id=820 bgcolor=#d6d6d6
| 418820 ||  || — || November 1, 2008 || Kitt Peak || Spacewatch || 7:4 || align=right | 3.5 km || 
|-id=821 bgcolor=#d6d6d6
| 418821 ||  || — || November 7, 2008 || Catalina || CSS || — || align=right | 3.1 km || 
|-id=822 bgcolor=#d6d6d6
| 418822 ||  || — || November 7, 2008 || Mount Lemmon || Mount Lemmon Survey || — || align=right | 3.7 km || 
|-id=823 bgcolor=#d6d6d6
| 418823 ||  || — || November 2, 2008 || Mount Lemmon || Mount Lemmon Survey || — || align=right | 2.9 km || 
|-id=824 bgcolor=#d6d6d6
| 418824 ||  || — || November 8, 2008 || Mount Lemmon || Mount Lemmon Survey || — || align=right | 6.3 km || 
|-id=825 bgcolor=#d6d6d6
| 418825 ||  || — || November 9, 2008 || Kitt Peak || Spacewatch || — || align=right | 4.5 km || 
|-id=826 bgcolor=#d6d6d6
| 418826 ||  || — || November 8, 2008 || Kitt Peak || Spacewatch || — || align=right | 3.5 km || 
|-id=827 bgcolor=#d6d6d6
| 418827 ||  || — || December 28, 2003 || Socorro || LINEAR || — || align=right | 3.6 km || 
|-id=828 bgcolor=#d6d6d6
| 418828 ||  || — || October 29, 2008 || Kitt Peak || Spacewatch || — || align=right | 3.0 km || 
|-id=829 bgcolor=#d6d6d6
| 418829 ||  || — || March 9, 2005 || Catalina || CSS || — || align=right | 3.8 km || 
|-id=830 bgcolor=#d6d6d6
| 418830 ||  || — || November 17, 2008 || Kitt Peak || Spacewatch || — || align=right | 3.2 km || 
|-id=831 bgcolor=#d6d6d6
| 418831 ||  || — || November 17, 2008 || Kitt Peak || Spacewatch || — || align=right | 2.9 km || 
|-id=832 bgcolor=#d6d6d6
| 418832 ||  || — || November 17, 2008 || Kitt Peak || Spacewatch || — || align=right | 2.5 km || 
|-id=833 bgcolor=#d6d6d6
| 418833 ||  || — || September 23, 2008 || Mount Lemmon || Mount Lemmon Survey || — || align=right | 2.4 km || 
|-id=834 bgcolor=#d6d6d6
| 418834 ||  || — || September 23, 2008 || Kitt Peak || Spacewatch || — || align=right | 2.8 km || 
|-id=835 bgcolor=#d6d6d6
| 418835 ||  || — || November 18, 2008 || Catalina || CSS || — || align=right | 3.9 km || 
|-id=836 bgcolor=#d6d6d6
| 418836 ||  || — || October 27, 2008 || Mount Lemmon || Mount Lemmon Survey || VER || align=right | 2.9 km || 
|-id=837 bgcolor=#d6d6d6
| 418837 ||  || — || November 19, 2008 || Mount Lemmon || Mount Lemmon Survey || — || align=right | 3.7 km || 
|-id=838 bgcolor=#d6d6d6
| 418838 ||  || — || November 17, 2008 || Farra d'Isonzo || Farra d'Isonzo || — || align=right | 2.9 km || 
|-id=839 bgcolor=#d6d6d6
| 418839 ||  || — || November 17, 2008 || Kitt Peak || Spacewatch || — || align=right | 3.2 km || 
|-id=840 bgcolor=#d6d6d6
| 418840 ||  || — || September 29, 2008 || Mount Lemmon || Mount Lemmon Survey || — || align=right | 3.4 km || 
|-id=841 bgcolor=#d6d6d6
| 418841 ||  || — || November 17, 2008 || Kitt Peak || Spacewatch || — || align=right | 2.7 km || 
|-id=842 bgcolor=#d6d6d6
| 418842 ||  || — || November 18, 2008 || Catalina || CSS || — || align=right | 3.5 km || 
|-id=843 bgcolor=#d6d6d6
| 418843 ||  || — || October 9, 2008 || Kitt Peak || Spacewatch || — || align=right | 2.6 km || 
|-id=844 bgcolor=#d6d6d6
| 418844 ||  || — || October 20, 2008 || Kitt Peak || Spacewatch || — || align=right | 3.4 km || 
|-id=845 bgcolor=#d6d6d6
| 418845 ||  || — || November 18, 2008 || Socorro || LINEAR || — || align=right | 3.5 km || 
|-id=846 bgcolor=#FFC2E0
| 418846 ||  || — || November 23, 2008 || Mount Lemmon || Mount Lemmon Survey || AMOcritical || align=right data-sort-value="0.20" | 200 m || 
|-id=847 bgcolor=#d6d6d6
| 418847 ||  || — || October 20, 2008 || Kitt Peak || Spacewatch || — || align=right | 3.1 km || 
|-id=848 bgcolor=#d6d6d6
| 418848 ||  || — || November 17, 2008 || Kitt Peak || Spacewatch || Tj (2.99) || align=right | 3.8 km || 
|-id=849 bgcolor=#FFC2E0
| 418849 ||  || — || November 24, 2008 || Mount Lemmon || Mount Lemmon Survey || APOPHA || align=right data-sort-value="0.28" | 280 m || 
|-id=850 bgcolor=#d6d6d6
| 418850 ||  || — || November 18, 2008 || Kitt Peak || Spacewatch || — || align=right | 2.6 km || 
|-id=851 bgcolor=#d6d6d6
| 418851 ||  || — || November 20, 2008 || Kitt Peak || Spacewatch || EOS || align=right | 1.8 km || 
|-id=852 bgcolor=#d6d6d6
| 418852 ||  || — || November 20, 2008 || Kitt Peak || Spacewatch || HYG || align=right | 2.5 km || 
|-id=853 bgcolor=#d6d6d6
| 418853 ||  || — || October 6, 2008 || Mount Lemmon || Mount Lemmon Survey || — || align=right | 3.8 km || 
|-id=854 bgcolor=#d6d6d6
| 418854 ||  || — || November 21, 2008 || Kitt Peak || Spacewatch || — || align=right | 4.4 km || 
|-id=855 bgcolor=#d6d6d6
| 418855 ||  || — || October 20, 2008 || Kitt Peak || Spacewatch || EOS || align=right | 2.3 km || 
|-id=856 bgcolor=#d6d6d6
| 418856 ||  || — || September 29, 2008 || Socorro || LINEAR || — || align=right | 4.7 km || 
|-id=857 bgcolor=#d6d6d6
| 418857 ||  || — || November 19, 2008 || Kitt Peak || Spacewatch || — || align=right | 2.9 km || 
|-id=858 bgcolor=#d6d6d6
| 418858 ||  || — || November 30, 2008 || Socorro || LINEAR || — || align=right | 4.0 km || 
|-id=859 bgcolor=#d6d6d6
| 418859 ||  || — || November 19, 2008 || Catalina || CSS || — || align=right | 4.7 km || 
|-id=860 bgcolor=#d6d6d6
| 418860 ||  || — || November 30, 2008 || Mount Lemmon || Mount Lemmon Survey || — || align=right | 3.2 km || 
|-id=861 bgcolor=#d6d6d6
| 418861 ||  || — || November 30, 2008 || Mount Lemmon || Mount Lemmon Survey || — || align=right | 3.0 km || 
|-id=862 bgcolor=#d6d6d6
| 418862 ||  || — || November 4, 2008 || Kitt Peak || Spacewatch || — || align=right | 3.1 km || 
|-id=863 bgcolor=#d6d6d6
| 418863 ||  || — || November 30, 2008 || Kitt Peak || Spacewatch || — || align=right | 2.9 km || 
|-id=864 bgcolor=#d6d6d6
| 418864 ||  || — || February 11, 2004 || Palomar || NEAT || — || align=right | 3.3 km || 
|-id=865 bgcolor=#d6d6d6
| 418865 ||  || — || November 24, 2008 || Mount Lemmon || Mount Lemmon Survey || — || align=right | 3.0 km || 
|-id=866 bgcolor=#d6d6d6
| 418866 ||  || — || November 19, 2008 || Kitt Peak || Spacewatch || — || align=right | 3.9 km || 
|-id=867 bgcolor=#d6d6d6
| 418867 ||  || — || November 22, 2008 || Socorro || LINEAR || — || align=right | 3.9 km || 
|-id=868 bgcolor=#d6d6d6
| 418868 ||  || — || November 30, 2008 || Socorro || LINEAR || — || align=right | 4.6 km || 
|-id=869 bgcolor=#d6d6d6
| 418869 ||  || — || November 30, 2008 || Socorro || LINEAR || THB || align=right | 4.1 km || 
|-id=870 bgcolor=#fefefe
| 418870 ||  || — || December 3, 2008 || Socorro || LINEAR || H || align=right | 1.1 km || 
|-id=871 bgcolor=#d6d6d6
| 418871 ||  || — || December 4, 2008 || Socorro || LINEAR || — || align=right | 4.1 km || 
|-id=872 bgcolor=#d6d6d6
| 418872 ||  || — || December 1, 2008 || Kitt Peak || Spacewatch || — || align=right | 3.0 km || 
|-id=873 bgcolor=#d6d6d6
| 418873 ||  || — || March 11, 2005 || Kitt Peak || Spacewatch || — || align=right | 4.1 km || 
|-id=874 bgcolor=#d6d6d6
| 418874 ||  || — || October 27, 2008 || Kitt Peak || Spacewatch || — || align=right | 3.8 km || 
|-id=875 bgcolor=#d6d6d6
| 418875 ||  || — || October 8, 2002 || Kitt Peak || Spacewatch || — || align=right | 2.6 km || 
|-id=876 bgcolor=#d6d6d6
| 418876 ||  || — || December 2, 2008 || Mount Lemmon || Mount Lemmon Survey || — || align=right | 4.0 km || 
|-id=877 bgcolor=#fefefe
| 418877 ||  || — || December 21, 2008 || Mount Lemmon || Mount Lemmon Survey || — || align=right data-sort-value="0.65" | 650 m || 
|-id=878 bgcolor=#d6d6d6
| 418878 ||  || — || December 21, 2008 || Mount Lemmon || Mount Lemmon Survey || — || align=right | 2.6 km || 
|-id=879 bgcolor=#d6d6d6
| 418879 ||  || — || December 28, 2008 || Piszkéstető || K. Sárneczky || — || align=right | 4.4 km || 
|-id=880 bgcolor=#d6d6d6
| 418880 ||  || — || December 28, 2008 || Dauban || F. Kugel || — || align=right | 3.6 km || 
|-id=881 bgcolor=#d6d6d6
| 418881 ||  || — || December 1, 2008 || Mount Lemmon || Mount Lemmon Survey || TIR || align=right | 3.5 km || 
|-id=882 bgcolor=#d6d6d6
| 418882 ||  || — || December 5, 2008 || Mount Lemmon || Mount Lemmon Survey || — || align=right | 4.0 km || 
|-id=883 bgcolor=#d6d6d6
| 418883 ||  || — || November 30, 2008 || Mount Lemmon || Mount Lemmon Survey || — || align=right | 3.4 km || 
|-id=884 bgcolor=#fefefe
| 418884 ||  || — || December 29, 2008 || Kitt Peak || Spacewatch || — || align=right data-sort-value="0.56" | 560 m || 
|-id=885 bgcolor=#d6d6d6
| 418885 ||  || — || December 29, 2008 || Kitt Peak || Spacewatch || — || align=right | 3.7 km || 
|-id=886 bgcolor=#d6d6d6
| 418886 ||  || — || December 21, 2008 || Kitt Peak || Spacewatch || — || align=right | 3.1 km || 
|-id=887 bgcolor=#d6d6d6
| 418887 ||  || — || December 29, 2008 || Kitt Peak || Spacewatch || — || align=right | 5.1 km || 
|-id=888 bgcolor=#fefefe
| 418888 ||  || — || December 30, 2008 || Kitt Peak || Spacewatch || — || align=right data-sort-value="0.84" | 840 m || 
|-id=889 bgcolor=#d6d6d6
| 418889 ||  || — || December 6, 2002 || Socorro || LINEAR || TIR || align=right | 3.0 km || 
|-id=890 bgcolor=#fefefe
| 418890 ||  || — || December 31, 2008 || Kitt Peak || Spacewatch || — || align=right data-sort-value="0.75" | 750 m || 
|-id=891 bgcolor=#d6d6d6
| 418891 Vizi ||  ||  || December 31, 2008 || Piszkéstető || K. Sárneczky || — || align=right | 4.2 km || 
|-id=892 bgcolor=#d6d6d6
| 418892 ||  || — || December 21, 2008 || Kitt Peak || Spacewatch || — || align=right | 6.1 km || 
|-id=893 bgcolor=#d6d6d6
| 418893 ||  || — || December 30, 2008 || Catalina || CSS || Tj (2.99) || align=right | 5.3 km || 
|-id=894 bgcolor=#d6d6d6
| 418894 ||  || — || December 22, 2008 || Kitt Peak || Spacewatch || — || align=right | 2.6 km || 
|-id=895 bgcolor=#d6d6d6
| 418895 ||  || — || October 24, 2008 || Mount Lemmon || Mount Lemmon Survey || EOS || align=right | 2.4 km || 
|-id=896 bgcolor=#FFC2E0
| 418896 ||  || — || January 6, 2009 || Siding Spring || SSS || APO || align=right data-sort-value="0.45" | 450 m || 
|-id=897 bgcolor=#d6d6d6
| 418897 ||  || — || January 3, 2009 || Kitt Peak || Spacewatch || — || align=right | 4.2 km || 
|-id=898 bgcolor=#d6d6d6
| 418898 ||  || — || December 21, 2008 || Mount Lemmon || Mount Lemmon Survey || — || align=right | 4.0 km || 
|-id=899 bgcolor=#d6d6d6
| 418899 ||  || — || January 15, 2009 || Kitt Peak || Spacewatch || — || align=right | 4.4 km || 
|-id=900 bgcolor=#FFC2E0
| 418900 ||  || — || January 16, 2009 || Kitt Peak || Spacewatch || APO || align=right data-sort-value="0.50" | 500 m || 
|}

418901–419000 

|-bgcolor=#d6d6d6
| 418901 ||  || — || January 17, 2009 || Kitt Peak || Spacewatch || — || align=right | 4.5 km || 
|-id=902 bgcolor=#fefefe
| 418902 ||  || — || January 16, 2009 || Kitt Peak || Spacewatch || — || align=right data-sort-value="0.70" | 700 m || 
|-id=903 bgcolor=#fefefe
| 418903 ||  || — || January 16, 2009 || Mount Lemmon || Mount Lemmon Survey || — || align=right data-sort-value="0.87" | 870 m || 
|-id=904 bgcolor=#fefefe
| 418904 ||  || — || January 25, 2009 || Catalina || CSS || — || align=right data-sort-value="0.96" | 960 m || 
|-id=905 bgcolor=#fefefe
| 418905 ||  || — || January 29, 2009 || Dauban || F. Kugel || — || align=right data-sort-value="0.71" | 710 m || 
|-id=906 bgcolor=#fefefe
| 418906 ||  || — || January 25, 2009 || Catalina || CSS || — || align=right data-sort-value="0.83" | 830 m || 
|-id=907 bgcolor=#d6d6d6
| 418907 ||  || — || January 31, 2009 || Socorro || LINEAR || — || align=right | 3.8 km || 
|-id=908 bgcolor=#fefefe
| 418908 ||  || — || January 25, 2009 || Kitt Peak || Spacewatch || — || align=right data-sort-value="0.86" | 860 m || 
|-id=909 bgcolor=#fefefe
| 418909 ||  || — || January 31, 2009 || Kitt Peak || Spacewatch || — || align=right data-sort-value="0.68" | 680 m || 
|-id=910 bgcolor=#fefefe
| 418910 ||  || — || January 31, 2009 || Kitt Peak || Spacewatch || — || align=right data-sort-value="0.55" | 550 m || 
|-id=911 bgcolor=#fefefe
| 418911 ||  || — || January 31, 2009 || Kitt Peak || Spacewatch || — || align=right data-sort-value="0.71" | 710 m || 
|-id=912 bgcolor=#fefefe
| 418912 ||  || — || January 18, 2009 || Mount Lemmon || Mount Lemmon Survey || — || align=right data-sort-value="0.69" | 690 m || 
|-id=913 bgcolor=#fefefe
| 418913 ||  || — || January 31, 2009 || Mount Lemmon || Mount Lemmon Survey || V || align=right data-sort-value="0.55" | 550 m || 
|-id=914 bgcolor=#fefefe
| 418914 ||  || — || January 31, 2009 || Kitt Peak || Spacewatch || — || align=right data-sort-value="0.64" | 640 m || 
|-id=915 bgcolor=#fefefe
| 418915 ||  || — || January 19, 2009 || Mount Lemmon || Mount Lemmon Survey || — || align=right data-sort-value="0.92" | 920 m || 
|-id=916 bgcolor=#fefefe
| 418916 ||  || — || January 20, 2009 || Kitt Peak || Spacewatch || — || align=right data-sort-value="0.67" | 670 m || 
|-id=917 bgcolor=#fefefe
| 418917 ||  || — || January 29, 2009 || Mount Lemmon || Mount Lemmon Survey || — || align=right data-sort-value="0.91" | 910 m || 
|-id=918 bgcolor=#fefefe
| 418918 ||  || — || February 1, 2009 || Kitt Peak || Spacewatch || — || align=right data-sort-value="0.67" | 670 m || 
|-id=919 bgcolor=#fefefe
| 418919 ||  || — || February 1, 2009 || Kitt Peak || Spacewatch || — || align=right data-sort-value="0.88" | 880 m || 
|-id=920 bgcolor=#fefefe
| 418920 ||  || — || February 1, 2009 || Kitt Peak || Spacewatch || — || align=right data-sort-value="0.79" | 790 m || 
|-id=921 bgcolor=#fefefe
| 418921 ||  || — || February 1, 2009 || Kitt Peak || Spacewatch || — || align=right data-sort-value="0.80" | 800 m || 
|-id=922 bgcolor=#fefefe
| 418922 ||  || — || February 3, 2009 || Kitt Peak || Spacewatch || — || align=right data-sort-value="0.70" | 700 m || 
|-id=923 bgcolor=#fefefe
| 418923 ||  || — || February 13, 2009 || Kitt Peak || Spacewatch || — || align=right data-sort-value="0.62" | 620 m || 
|-id=924 bgcolor=#d6d6d6
| 418924 ||  || — || February 14, 2009 || Calar Alto || F. Hormuth || — || align=right | 4.5 km || 
|-id=925 bgcolor=#fefefe
| 418925 ||  || — || February 14, 2009 || Kitt Peak || Spacewatch || — || align=right data-sort-value="0.59" | 590 m || 
|-id=926 bgcolor=#fefefe
| 418926 ||  || — || February 14, 2009 || La Sagra || OAM Obs. || — || align=right data-sort-value="0.76" | 760 m || 
|-id=927 bgcolor=#fefefe
| 418927 ||  || — || March 25, 2006 || Kitt Peak || Spacewatch || — || align=right data-sort-value="0.66" | 660 m || 
|-id=928 bgcolor=#fefefe
| 418928 ||  || — || February 18, 2009 || Wildberg || R. Apitzsch || — || align=right data-sort-value="0.79" | 790 m || 
|-id=929 bgcolor=#FFC2E0
| 418929 ||  || — || February 19, 2009 || Catalina || CSS || AMO +1km || align=right | 1.4 km || 
|-id=930 bgcolor=#d6d6d6
| 418930 ||  || — || February 16, 2009 || Dauban || F. Kugel || — || align=right | 4.8 km || 
|-id=931 bgcolor=#fefefe
| 418931 ||  || — || January 25, 2009 || Kitt Peak || Spacewatch || (2076) || align=right data-sort-value="0.65" | 650 m || 
|-id=932 bgcolor=#fefefe
| 418932 ||  || — || February 19, 2009 || Dauban || F. Kugel || — || align=right data-sort-value="0.62" | 620 m || 
|-id=933 bgcolor=#d6d6d6
| 418933 ||  || — || February 19, 2009 || Kitt Peak || Spacewatch || Tj (2.99) || align=right | 4.4 km || 
|-id=934 bgcolor=#fefefe
| 418934 ||  || — || February 19, 2009 || Kitt Peak || Spacewatch || — || align=right data-sort-value="0.72" | 720 m || 
|-id=935 bgcolor=#fefefe
| 418935 ||  || — || February 22, 2009 || Kitt Peak || Spacewatch || — || align=right | 1.3 km || 
|-id=936 bgcolor=#fefefe
| 418936 ||  || — || February 22, 2009 || Kitt Peak || Spacewatch || V || align=right data-sort-value="0.69" | 690 m || 
|-id=937 bgcolor=#fefefe
| 418937 ||  || — || February 3, 2009 || Kitt Peak || Spacewatch || — || align=right data-sort-value="0.65" | 650 m || 
|-id=938 bgcolor=#fefefe
| 418938 ||  || — || February 26, 2009 || Catalina || CSS || — || align=right data-sort-value="0.83" | 830 m || 
|-id=939 bgcolor=#fefefe
| 418939 ||  || — || February 21, 2009 || Kitt Peak || Spacewatch || — || align=right data-sort-value="0.56" | 560 m || 
|-id=940 bgcolor=#fefefe
| 418940 ||  || — || February 24, 2009 || Mount Lemmon || Mount Lemmon Survey || — || align=right data-sort-value="0.64" | 640 m || 
|-id=941 bgcolor=#fefefe
| 418941 ||  || — || February 28, 2009 || Kitt Peak || Spacewatch || — || align=right data-sort-value="0.81" | 810 m || 
|-id=942 bgcolor=#fefefe
| 418942 ||  || — || March 14, 2002 || Kitt Peak || Spacewatch || — || align=right data-sort-value="0.83" | 830 m || 
|-id=943 bgcolor=#fefefe
| 418943 ||  || — || February 26, 2009 || Kitt Peak || Spacewatch || — || align=right data-sort-value="0.94" | 940 m || 
|-id=944 bgcolor=#fefefe
| 418944 ||  || — || February 26, 2009 || Kitt Peak || Spacewatch || V || align=right data-sort-value="0.52" | 520 m || 
|-id=945 bgcolor=#fefefe
| 418945 ||  || — || February 24, 2009 || Mount Lemmon || Mount Lemmon Survey || — || align=right data-sort-value="0.80" | 800 m || 
|-id=946 bgcolor=#fefefe
| 418946 ||  || — || August 4, 2003 || Kitt Peak || Spacewatch || V || align=right data-sort-value="0.70" | 700 m || 
|-id=947 bgcolor=#fefefe
| 418947 ||  || — || March 15, 2009 || Catalina || CSS || — || align=right data-sort-value="0.81" | 810 m || 
|-id=948 bgcolor=#fefefe
| 418948 ||  || — || March 15, 2009 || Kitt Peak || Spacewatch || NYS || align=right data-sort-value="0.65" | 650 m || 
|-id=949 bgcolor=#fefefe
| 418949 ||  || — || October 21, 2007 || Mount Lemmon || Mount Lemmon Survey || — || align=right data-sort-value="0.77" | 770 m || 
|-id=950 bgcolor=#fefefe
| 418950 ||  || — || March 1, 2009 || Mount Lemmon || Mount Lemmon Survey || — || align=right data-sort-value="0.83" | 830 m || 
|-id=951 bgcolor=#d6d6d6
| 418951 ||  || — || March 1, 2009 || Kitt Peak || Spacewatch || SHU3:2 || align=right | 6.5 km || 
|-id=952 bgcolor=#fefefe
| 418952 ||  || — || March 16, 2009 || Kitt Peak || Spacewatch || NYS || align=right data-sort-value="0.71" | 710 m || 
|-id=953 bgcolor=#fefefe
| 418953 ||  || — || March 20, 2009 || La Sagra || OAM Obs. || — || align=right data-sort-value="0.79" | 790 m || 
|-id=954 bgcolor=#fefefe
| 418954 ||  || — || March 19, 2009 || Kitt Peak || Spacewatch || — || align=right data-sort-value="0.77" | 770 m || 
|-id=955 bgcolor=#fefefe
| 418955 ||  || — || March 28, 2009 || Mount Lemmon || Mount Lemmon Survey || — || align=right data-sort-value="0.86" | 860 m || 
|-id=956 bgcolor=#fefefe
| 418956 ||  || — || March 26, 2009 || Kitt Peak || Spacewatch || — || align=right data-sort-value="0.89" | 890 m || 
|-id=957 bgcolor=#fefefe
| 418957 ||  || — || March 21, 2009 || Catalina || CSS || — || align=right data-sort-value="0.89" | 890 m || 
|-id=958 bgcolor=#fefefe
| 418958 ||  || — || March 27, 2009 || Mount Lemmon || Mount Lemmon Survey || NYS || align=right data-sort-value="0.65" | 650 m || 
|-id=959 bgcolor=#fefefe
| 418959 ||  || — || March 24, 2009 || Mount Lemmon || Mount Lemmon Survey || — || align=right | 1.00 km || 
|-id=960 bgcolor=#fefefe
| 418960 ||  || — || March 26, 2009 || Mount Lemmon || Mount Lemmon Survey || — || align=right | 1.0 km || 
|-id=961 bgcolor=#fefefe
| 418961 ||  || — || January 20, 2009 || Mount Lemmon || Mount Lemmon Survey || — || align=right data-sort-value="0.92" | 920 m || 
|-id=962 bgcolor=#fefefe
| 418962 ||  || — || April 2, 2009 || Kitt Peak || Spacewatch || — || align=right data-sort-value="0.61" | 610 m || 
|-id=963 bgcolor=#d6d6d6
| 418963 ||  || — || April 17, 2009 || Kitt Peak || Spacewatch || 3:2 || align=right | 4.7 km || 
|-id=964 bgcolor=#fefefe
| 418964 ||  || — || April 17, 2009 || Catalina || CSS || — || align=right data-sort-value="0.85" | 850 m || 
|-id=965 bgcolor=#fefefe
| 418965 ||  || — || May 30, 2006 || Mount Lemmon || Mount Lemmon Survey || V || align=right data-sort-value="0.80" | 800 m || 
|-id=966 bgcolor=#fefefe
| 418966 ||  || — || April 16, 2009 || Catalina || CSS || — || align=right data-sort-value="0.81" | 810 m || 
|-id=967 bgcolor=#fefefe
| 418967 ||  || — || April 19, 2009 || Kitt Peak || Spacewatch || — || align=right | 1.0 km || 
|-id=968 bgcolor=#fefefe
| 418968 ||  || — || April 20, 2009 || Mount Lemmon || Mount Lemmon Survey || — || align=right data-sort-value="0.85" | 850 m || 
|-id=969 bgcolor=#fefefe
| 418969 ||  || — || April 21, 2009 || Kitt Peak || Spacewatch || V || align=right data-sort-value="0.68" | 680 m || 
|-id=970 bgcolor=#fefefe
| 418970 ||  || — || March 17, 2009 || Kitt Peak || Spacewatch || — || align=right data-sort-value="0.73" | 730 m || 
|-id=971 bgcolor=#fefefe
| 418971 ||  || — || April 17, 2009 || Kitt Peak || Spacewatch || — || align=right data-sort-value="0.56" | 560 m || 
|-id=972 bgcolor=#fefefe
| 418972 ||  || — || April 21, 2009 || Mount Lemmon || Mount Lemmon Survey || MAS || align=right data-sort-value="0.75" | 750 m || 
|-id=973 bgcolor=#fefefe
| 418973 ||  || — || April 1, 2009 || Kitt Peak || Spacewatch || — || align=right data-sort-value="0.92" | 920 m || 
|-id=974 bgcolor=#fefefe
| 418974 ||  || — || April 19, 2009 || Mount Lemmon || Mount Lemmon Survey || — || align=right data-sort-value="0.85" | 850 m || 
|-id=975 bgcolor=#E9E9E9
| 418975 ||  || — || April 29, 2009 || Kitt Peak || Spacewatch || — || align=right | 2.0 km || 
|-id=976 bgcolor=#fefefe
| 418976 ||  || — || April 27, 2009 || Mount Lemmon || Mount Lemmon Survey || — || align=right data-sort-value="0.63" | 630 m || 
|-id=977 bgcolor=#fefefe
| 418977 ||  || — || April 29, 2009 || Kitt Peak || Spacewatch || — || align=right data-sort-value="0.84" | 840 m || 
|-id=978 bgcolor=#fefefe
| 418978 ||  || — || October 17, 2007 || Mount Lemmon || Mount Lemmon Survey || V || align=right data-sort-value="0.73" | 730 m || 
|-id=979 bgcolor=#C2FFFF
| 418979 ||  || — || April 18, 2009 || Mount Lemmon || Mount Lemmon Survey || L5 || align=right | 9.5 km || 
|-id=980 bgcolor=#E9E9E9
| 418980 ||  || — || April 29, 2009 || Mount Lemmon || Mount Lemmon Survey || EUN || align=right | 1.7 km || 
|-id=981 bgcolor=#fefefe
| 418981 ||  || — || May 13, 2009 || Kitt Peak || Spacewatch || — || align=right data-sort-value="0.69" | 690 m || 
|-id=982 bgcolor=#fefefe
| 418982 ||  || — || April 23, 2009 || Kitt Peak || Spacewatch || — || align=right data-sort-value="0.79" | 790 m || 
|-id=983 bgcolor=#fefefe
| 418983 ||  || — || April 21, 2009 || Kitt Peak || Spacewatch || NYS || align=right data-sort-value="0.65" | 650 m || 
|-id=984 bgcolor=#fefefe
| 418984 ||  || — || May 18, 2009 || Skylive Obs. || F. Tozzi || — || align=right | 1.2 km || 
|-id=985 bgcolor=#fefefe
| 418985 ||  || — || May 25, 2009 || Kitt Peak || Spacewatch || — || align=right data-sort-value="0.79" | 790 m || 
|-id=986 bgcolor=#C2FFFF
| 418986 ||  || — || May 24, 2009 || Kitt Peak || Spacewatch || L5 || align=right | 12 km || 
|-id=987 bgcolor=#C2FFFF
| 418987 ||  || — || March 25, 2009 || Mount Lemmon || Mount Lemmon Survey || L5 || align=right | 11 km || 
|-id=988 bgcolor=#C2FFFF
| 418988 ||  || — || April 17, 2009 || Mount Lemmon || Mount Lemmon Survey || L5 || align=right | 8.6 km || 
|-id=989 bgcolor=#fefefe
| 418989 ||  || — || April 27, 2009 || Kitt Peak || Spacewatch || — || align=right data-sort-value="0.96" | 960 m || 
|-id=990 bgcolor=#E9E9E9
| 418990 ||  || — || May 27, 2009 || Mount Lemmon || Mount Lemmon Survey || — || align=right | 1.4 km || 
|-id=991 bgcolor=#fefefe
| 418991 ||  || — || December 21, 2003 || Kitt Peak || Spacewatch || V || align=right data-sort-value="0.83" | 830 m || 
|-id=992 bgcolor=#E9E9E9
| 418992 ||  || — || May 27, 2009 || Mount Lemmon || Mount Lemmon Survey || — || align=right | 1.6 km || 
|-id=993 bgcolor=#C2E0FF
| 418993 ||  || — || June 25, 2009 || Mauna Kea || J.-M. Petit, B. Gladman, J. J. Kavelaars || centaur || align=right | 50 km || 
|-id=994 bgcolor=#E9E9E9
| 418994 ||  || — || July 4, 2009 || La Sagra || OAM Obs. || — || align=right | 2.7 km || 
|-id=995 bgcolor=#E9E9E9
| 418995 ||  || — || July 16, 2009 || La Sagra || OAM Obs. || JUN || align=right | 1.4 km || 
|-id=996 bgcolor=#E9E9E9
| 418996 ||  || — || July 29, 2009 || La Sagra || OAM Obs. || — || align=right | 2.7 km || 
|-id=997 bgcolor=#C2FFFF
| 418997 ||  || — || July 27, 2009 || Kitt Peak || Spacewatch || L5 || align=right | 13 km || 
|-id=998 bgcolor=#E9E9E9
| 418998 ||  || — || July 28, 2009 || Catalina || CSS || — || align=right | 2.1 km || 
|-id=999 bgcolor=#E9E9E9
| 418999 ||  || — || June 16, 2009 || Mount Lemmon || Mount Lemmon Survey || MAR || align=right | 1.1 km || 
|-id=000 bgcolor=#E9E9E9
| 419000 ||  || — || January 24, 2007 || Mount Lemmon || Mount Lemmon Survey || — || align=right | 2.3 km || 
|}

References

External links 
 Discovery Circumstances: Numbered Minor Planets (415001)–(420000) (IAU Minor Planet Center)

0418